This page lists all described genera and species of the spider family Pholcidae. , the World Spider Catalog accepts 1820 species in 94 genera:

A

Aetana

Aetana Huber, 2005
 Aetana abadae Huber, 2015 — Philippines
 Aetana baganihan Huber, 2015 — Philippines
 Aetana banahaw Huber, 2015 — Philippines
 Aetana fiji Huber, 2005 — Fiji
 Aetana gaya Huber, 2015 — Malaysia (Gaya Is.)
 Aetana indah Huber, 2015 — Borneo
 Aetana kinabalu Huber, 2005 — Borneo
 Aetana kiukoki Huber, 2015 — Philippines
 Aetana lambir Huber, 2015 — Borneo
 Aetana libjo Huber, 2015 — Philippines
 Aetana loboc Huber, 2015 — Philippines
 Aetana lozadae Huber, 2015 — Philippines
 Aetana manansalai Huber, 2015 — Philippines
 Aetana mokwam Huber, 2019 — Indonesia (West Papua)
 Aetana ocampoi Huber, 2015 — Philippines
 Aetana omayan Huber, 2005 (type) — Philippines
 Aetana ondawamei Huber, 2019 — Indonesia (West Papua)
 Aetana paragua Huber, 2015 — Philippines
 Aetana pasambai Huber, 2015 — Philippines
 Aetana poring Huber, 2015 — Borneo
 Aetana ternate Huber, 2019 — Indonesia (Ternate, North Maluku)

Anansus

Anansus Huber, 2007
 Anansus aowin Huber, 2007 (type) — Ivory Coast
 Anansus atewa Huber & Kwapong, 2013 — Ghana
 Anansus debakkeri Huber, 2007 — Congo
 Anansus ewe Huber, 2007 — West Africa
 Anansus kamwai Huber, 2014 — Cameroon

Anopsicus

Anopsicus Chamberlin & Ivie, 1938
 Anopsicus alteriae Gertsch, 1982 — Mexico
 Anopsicus banksi (Gertsch, 1939) — Ecuador (Galapagos Is.)
 Anopsicus beatus Gertsch, 1982 — Mexico
 Anopsicus bispinosus (Gertsch, 1971) — Mexico
 Anopsicus bolivari (Gertsch, 1971) — Mexico
 Anopsicus boneti Gertsch, 1982 — Mexico
 Anopsicus bryantae Gertsch, 1982 — Jamaica
 Anopsicus ceiba Gertsch, 1982 — Honduras
 Anopsicus chiapa Gertsch, 1982 — Mexico
 Anopsicus chickeringi Gertsch, 1982 — Panama
 Anopsicus chiriqui Gertsch, 1982 — Costa Rica, Panama
 Anopsicus clarus Gertsch, 1982 — Jamaica
 Anopsicus concinnus Gertsch, 1982 — Costa Rica
 Anopsicus covadonga Gertsch, 1982 — Mexico
 Anopsicus cubanus Gertsch, 1982 — Cuba
 Anopsicus davisi (Gertsch, 1939) — Mexico
 Anopsicus debora (Gertsch, 1977) — Mexico
 Anopsicus definitus Gertsch, 1982 — Honduras
 Anopsicus elliotti (Gertsch, 1971) — Mexico
 Anopsicus evansi (Gertsch, 1971) — Mexico
 Anopsicus exiguus (Gertsch, 1971) — Mexico
 Anopsicus facetus Gertsch, 1982 — Costa Rica
 Anopsicus grubbsi Gertsch, 1982 — Mexico
 Anopsicus gruta (Gertsch, 1971) — Mexico
 Anopsicus hanakash (Brignoli, 1974) — Guatemala
 Anopsicus iviei Gertsch, 1982 — Mexico
 Anopsicus jarmila Gertsch, 1982 — Jamaica
 Anopsicus jeanae (Gertsch, 1977) — Mexico
 Anopsicus joyoa Gertsch, 1982 — Honduras
 Anopsicus lewisi Gertsch, 1982 — Jamaica
 Anopsicus limpidus Gertsch, 1982 — Jamaica
 Anopsicus lucidus Gertsch, 1982 — Mexico
 Anopsicus malkini Gertsch, 1982 — Mexico
 Anopsicus mckenziei Gertsch, 1982 — Mexico
 Anopsicus mirabilis Gertsch, 1982 — Mexico
 Anopsicus mitchelli (Gertsch, 1971) — Mexico
 Anopsicus modicus Gertsch, 1982 — Mexico
 Anopsicus nebulosus Gertsch, 1982 — Jamaica
 Anopsicus niveus Gertsch, 1982 — Mexico
 Anopsicus nortoni Gertsch, 1982 — Jamaica
 Anopsicus ocote Gertsch, 1982 — Mexico
 Anopsicus palenque (Gertsch, 1977) — Mexico
 Anopsicus panama Gertsch, 1982 — Panama
 Anopsicus pearsei Chamberlin & Ivie, 1938 (type) — Mexico
 Anopsicus pecki Gertsch, 1982 — Jamaica
 Anopsicus placens (O. Pickard-Cambridge, 1896) — Mexico
 Anopsicus potrero Gertsch, 1982 — Mexico
 Anopsicus puebla Gertsch, 1982 — Mexico
 Anopsicus pulcher (Bryant, 1940) — Cuba
 Anopsicus quatoculus Gertsch, 1982 — Jamaica
 Anopsicus quietus (Gertsch, 1973) — Guatemala
 Anopsicus reddelli Gertsch, 1982 — Mexico
 Anopsicus silvai Gertsch, 1982 — Cuba
 Anopsicus silvanus Gertsch, 1982 — Belize
 Anopsicus soileauae Gertsch, 1982 — Mexico
 Anopsicus speophilus (Chamberlin & Ivie, 1938) — Mexico, Guatemala
 Anopsicus tehuanus Gertsch, 1982 — Mexico
 Anopsicus tico Huber, 1998 — Costa Rica
 Anopsicus troglodyta (Gertsch, 1971) — Mexico
 Anopsicus turrialba Gertsch, 1982 — Costa Rica
 Anopsicus vinnulus Gertsch, 1982 — Mexico
 Anopsicus wileyae Gertsch, 1982 — Mexico
 Anopsicus zeteki (Gertsch, 1939) — Panama
 Anopsicus zimmermani Gertsch, 1982 — Jamaica

Apokayana

Apokayana Huber, 2018
 Apokayana bako (Huber, 2011) — Malaysia (Borneo)
 Apokayana iban (Huber, 2011) — Malaysia (Borneo)
 Apokayana kapit (Huber, 2016) (type) — Malaysia (Borneo)
 Apokayana kubah (Huber, 2016) — Malaysia (Borneo)
 Apokayana niah (Huber, 2016) — Malaysia (Borneo)
 Apokayana nigrifrons (Deeleman-Reinhold & Deeleman, 1983) — Indonesia (Borneo)
 Apokayana pueh (Huber, 2016) — Malaysia (Borneo)
 Apokayana sedgwicki (Deeleman-Reinhold & Platnick, 1986) — Malaysia (Borneo)
 Apokayana seowi (Huber, 2016) — Malaysia (Borneo)
 Apokayana tahai (Huber, 2011) — Indonesia (Borneo)

Arenita

Arenita Huber & Carvalho, 2019
 Arenita fazendinha Huber & Carvalho, 2019 (type) — Brazil

Arnapa

Arnapa Huber, 2019
 Arnapa arfak Huber, 2019 (type) — Indonesia (West Papua)
 Arnapa manokwari Huber, 2019 — Indonesia (West Papua)
 Arnapa meja Huber, 2019 — Indonesia (West Papua)
 Arnapa nigromaculata (Kulczyński, 1911) — New Guinea
 Arnapa tinoor Huber, 2019 — Indonesia (Sulawesi)
 Arnapa tolire Huber, 2019 — Indonesia (Ternate, North Maluku)

Artema

Artema Walckenaer, 1837
 Artema atlanta Walckenaer, 1837 (type) — Northern Africa and Middle East. Introduced elsewhere (mainly tropical and subtropical regions)
 Artema bahla Huber, 2019 — Oman
 Artema bunkpurugu Huber & Kwapong, 2013 — West Africa
 Artema dhofar Huber, 2019 — Oman
 Artema doriae (Thorell, 1881) — Turkey, Israel, United Arab Emirates, Iran, Afghanistan. Introduced: Japan
 Artema ghubrat Huber, 2019 — Oman
 Artema kochi Kulczyński, 1901 — Eritrea, Ethiopia, Sudan, Yemen, Egypt?
 Artema magna Roewer, 1960 — Afghanistan, Pakistan?
 Artema nephilit Aharon, Huber & Gavish-Regev, 2017 — Greece, Turkey, Cyprus, Israel, Jordan, Yemen?, United Arab Emirates?
 Artema transcaspica Spassky, 1934 — Tajikistan, Turkmenistan, Uzbekistan
 Artema ziaretana (Roewer, 1960) — Afghanistan

Aucana

Aucana Huber, 2000
 Aucana kaala Huber, 2000 — New Caledonia
 Aucana paposo Huber, 2000 — Chile
 Aucana petorca Huber, 2000 — Chile
 Aucana platnicki Huber, 2000 (type) — Chile
 Aucana ramirezi Huber, 2000 — Chile

Aymaria

Aymaria Huber, 2000
 Aymaria calilegua Huber, 2000 — Peru, Bolivia, Argentina
 Aymaria conica (Banks, 1902) (type) — Ecuador (Galapagos Is.)
 Aymaria dasyops (Mello-Leitão, 1947) — Bolivia
 Aymaria floreana (Gertsch & Peck, 1992) — Ecuador (Galapagos Is.)
 Aymaria insularis (Banks, 1902) — Ecuador (Galapagos Is.)
 Aymaria jarmila (Gertsch & Peck, 1992) — Ecuador (Galapagos Is.)
 Aymaria pakitza Huber, 2000 — Peru

B

Belisana

Belisana Thorell, 1898
B. airai Huber, 2005 – Caroline Is.
B. akebona (Komatsu, 1961) – Japan
B. aliformis Tong & Li, 2008 – China
B. amabilis (Paik, 1978) – Korea
B. ambengan Huber, 2005 – Bali
B. anhuiensis (Xu & Wang, 1984) – China
B. aninaj Huber, 2005 – Thailand
B. apo Huber, 2005 – Philippines
B. australis Huber, 2001 – Indonesia (Moluccas), Australia (Northern Territory, Queensland)
B. babensis Yao, Pham & Li, 2015 – Vietnam
B. bachma Zhu & Li, 2021 – Vietnam
B. badulla Huber, 2019 – Sri Lanka
B. banlakwo Huber, 2005 – Thailand
B. bantham Huber, 2005 – Thailand
B. bawangensis Zhang & Peng, 2011 – China
B. benjamini Huber, 2005 – Sri Lanka
B. bohorok Huber, 2005 – Malaysia, Indonesia (Sumatra, Borneo)
B. bubeng Zhu & Li, 2021 – China
B. cas Yao & Li, 2018 – China
B. champasakensis Yao & Li, 2013 – Laos
B. chaoanensis Zhang & Peng, 2011 – China
B. cheni Yao, Pham & Li, 2015 – Vietnam
B. chenjini Yao & Li, 2018 – China
B. clavata Yao, Pham & Li, 2015 – Vietnam
B. colubrina Zhang & Peng, 2011 – China
B. crystallina Yao & Li, 2013 – Laos
B. cucphuong Zhu & Li, 2021 – Vietnam
B. curva Yao, Pham & Li, 2015 – Vietnam
B. daji Chen, Zhang & Zhu, 2009 – China
B. davao Huber, 2005 – Philippines, Indonesia (Borneo)
B. decora Yao, Pham & Li, 2015 – Vietnam
B. denticulata Pham, 2015 – Vietnam
B. desciscens Tong & Li, 2009 – China
B. dian Yao & Li, 2018 – China
B. diaoluoensis Zhang & Peng, 2011 – China
B. dodabetta Huber, 2005 – India
B. doloduo Huber, 2005 – Indonesia (Sulawesi)
B. douqing Chen, Zhang & Zhu, 2009 – China
B. erawan Huber, 2005 – Thailand
B. erromena Zhang & Peng, 2011 – China
B. exian Tong & Li, 2009 – China
B. fiji Huber, 2005 – Fiji
B. floreni Huber, 2005 – Borneo
B. flores Huber, 2005 – Indonesia
B. forcipata (Tu, 1994) – China
B. fraser Huber, 2005 – Malaysia
B. freyae Huber, 2005 – Indonesia (Sumatra)
B. galeiformis Zhang & Peng, 2011 – China
B. gedeh Huber, 2005 – Indonesia (Java)
B. gigantea Yao & Li, 2013 – Laos
B. gowindahela Huber, 2019 – Sri Lanka
B. guilin Yao & Li, 2020 – China
B. gupian Yao & Li, 2018 – China
B. gyirong Zhang, Zhu & Song, 2006 – China
B. halongensis Yao, Pham & Li, 2015 – Vietnam
B. hormigai Huber, 2005 – Thailand
B. huberi Tong & Li, 2008 – China
B. inthanon Huber, 2005 – Thailand
B. jaegeri Zhu & Li, 2021 – Malaysia (peninsula)
B. jimi Huber, 2005 – New Guinea
B. junkoae (Irie, 1997) – Taiwan, Japan
B. kachin Zhu & Li, 2021 – Myanmar
B. kaharian Huber, 2005 – Borneo
B. kendari Huber, 2005 – Indonesia (Sulawesi)
B. ketambe Huber, 2005 – Thailand, Indonesia (Sumatra)
B. keyti Huber, 2005 – Sri Lanka
B. khanensis Yao & Li, 2013 – Laos
B. khaosok Huber, 2005 – Thailand
B. khaoyai Huber, 2005 – Thailand
B. khieo Huber, 2005 – Thailand
B. kinabalu Huber, 2005 – Borneo
B. lamellaris Tong & Li, 2008 – China
B. lancea Yao & Li, 2013 – Laos
B. lata Zhang & Peng, 2011 – China
B. leclerci Huber, 2005 – Thailand
B. leumas Huber, 2005 – Thailand
B. leuser Huber, 2005 – Thailand, Malaysia, Indonesia (Sumatra, Borneo)
B. lii Chen, Yu & Guo, 2016 – China
B. limpida (Simon, 1909) – Vietnam
B. longinqua Zhang & Peng, 2011 – China
B. mainling Zhang, Zhu & Song, 2006 – China
B. maoer Yao & Li, 2020 – China
B. maogan Tong & Li, 2009 – China
B. marena Huber, 2005 – Indonesia (Sulawesi)
B. martensi Yao & Li, 2013 – Laos
B. marusiki Huber, 2005 – India
B. medog Yao & Li, 2020 – China
B. menghai Yao & Li, 2019 – China
B. mengla Yao & Li, 2020 – China
B. menglun Yao & Li, 2020 – China
B. mengyang Yao & Li, 2020 – China
B. minneriya Huber, 2019 – Sri Lanka
B. muruo Yao & Li, 2020 – China
B. nahtanoj Huber, 2005 – Indonesia (Sulawesi)
B. naling Yao & Li, 2020 – China
B. nomis Huber, 2005 – Malaysia, Singapore
B. nujiang Huber, 2005 – China
B. parallelica Zhang & Peng, 2011 – China
B. phungae Yao, Pham & Li, 2015 – Vietnam
B. phurua Huber, 2005 – Thailand
B. pianma Huber, 2005 – China
B. pisinna Yao, Pham & Li, 2015 – Vietnam
B. pranburi Huber, 2005 – Thailand
B. protumida Yao, Li & Jäger, 2014 – Malaysia
B. putao Yao & Li, 2020 – Myanmar
B. ranong Huber, 2005 – Thailand
B. ratnapura Huber, 2005 – Sri Lanka
B. rollofoliolata (Wang, 1983) – China
B. sabah Huber, 2005 – Borneo
B. sandakan Huber, 2005 – Malaysia, Indonesia (Sumatra, Borneo)
B. sarika Huber, 2005 – Thailand
B. scharffi Huber, 2005 – Thailand
B. schwendingeri Huber, 2005 – China, Thailand, Vietnam
B. sepaku Huber, 2005 – Vietnam, Indonesia (Borneo)
B. strinatii Huber, 2005 – Malaysia
B. sumba Huber, 2005 – Indonesia
B. tadetuensis Yao & Li, 2013 – Laos
B. tambligan Huber, 2005 – Indonesia (Java, Bali)
B. tarang Zhu & Li, 2021 – Indonesia (Sumatra)
B. tauricornis Thorell, 1898 (type) – Myanmar
B. tianlinensis Zhang & Peng, 2011 – China
B. tongle Zhang, Chen & Zhu, 2008 – China
B. triangula Yao, Pham & Li, 2015 – Vietnam
B. vietnamensis Yao, Pham & Li, 2015 – Vietnam
B. wau Huber, 2005 – New Guinea
B. xiangensis Yao & Li, 2013 – Laos
B. xiaolongha Zhu & Li, 2021 – China
B. xigaze Zhu & Li, 2021 – China
B. xishuangbanna Yao & Li, 2019 – China
B. xishui Chen, Zhang & Zhu, 2009 – China
B. xiyuan Yao & Li, 2020 – China
B. xuanguan Yao & Li, 2020 – China
B. yadongensis (Hu, 1985) – China
B. yalong Tong & Li, 2009 – China
B. yanbaruensis (Irie, 2002) – Japan
B. yangi Zhang & Peng, 2011 – China
B. yangxiaodongi Yao & Li, 2018 – China
B. yanhe Chen, Zhang & Zhu, 2009 – China
B. yap Huber, 2005 – Caroline Is.
B. yuexiu Yao & Li, 2020 – China
B. zham Yao & Li, 2020 – China
B. zhangi Tong & Li, 2007 – China
B. zhengi Yao, Pham & Li, 2015 – China, Vietnam

Blancoa

Blancoa Huber, 2000
 Blancoa guacharo Huber, 2000 — Venezuela
 Blancoa piacoa Huber, 2000 (type) — Venezuela

Buitinga

Buitinga Huber, 2003
 Buitinga amani Huber, 2003 — Tanzania
 Buitinga asax Huber, 2003 — Tanzania
 Buitinga batwa Huber & Warui, 2012 — Uganda
 Buitinga buhoma Huber, 2003 — Uganda
 Buitinga ensifera (Tullgren, 1910) — Tanzania
 Buitinga globosa (Tullgren, 1910) — Tanzania
 Buitinga griswoldi Huber, 2003 — Uganda
 Buitinga kadogo Huber, 2003 (type) — Tanzania
 Buitinga kanzuiri Huber, 2003 — Congo
 Buitinga kihanga Huber, 2003 — Tanzania
 Buitinga kikura Huber, 2003 — Congo
 Buitinga lakilingo Huber, 2003 — Tanzania
 Buitinga mazumbai Huber, 2003 — Tanzania
 Buitinga mbomole Huber, 2003 — Kenya, Tanzania
 Buitinga mulanje Huber, 2003 — Malawi
 Buitinga nigrescens (Berland, 1920) — Kenya, Tanzania
 Buitinga ruhiza Huber, 2003 — Uganda
 Buitinga ruwenzori Huber, 2003 — Congo, Uganda
 Buitinga safura Huber, 2003 — Tanzania
 Buitinga tingatingai Huber, 2003 — Tanzania
 Buitinga uzungwa Huber, 2003 — Tanzania
 Buitinga wataita Huber & Warui, 2012 — Kenya

C

Calapnita

Calapnita Simon, 1892
 Calapnita bariengi Huber, 2017 — Malaysia (Borneo)
 Calapnita bario Huber, 2017 — Malaysia (Borneo)
 Calapnita bohoi Huber, 2017 — Philippines (Bohoi Is.)
 Calapnita bugis Huber, 2017 — Indonesia (Sulawesi)
 Calapnita dayak Huber, 2017 — Indonesia (Borneo)
 Calapnita dinagat Huber, 2017 — Philippines (Dinagat Is.)
 Calapnita lawangan Huber, 2017 — Indonesia (Borneo)
 Calapnita loksado Huber, 2017 — Indonesia (Borneo)
 Calapnita longa Yao & Li, 2013 — Laos
 Calapnita mae Huber, 2017 — Philippines (Mindanao)
 Calapnita magaseng Huber, 2017 — Malaysia (Borneo)
 Calapnita maragusan Huber, 2017 — Philippines (Mindanao)
 Calapnita nunezae Huber, 2017 — Philippines (Mindanao, Camiguin Is.)
 Calapnita saluang Huber, 2011 — Thailand, Malaysia (mainland), Indonesia (Sumatra, Java)
 Calapnita vermiformis Simon, 1892 (type) — Philippines

Canaima

Canaima Huber, 2000
 Canaima arima (Gertsch, 1982) (type) — Trinidad
 Canaima merida Huber, 2000 — Venezuela

Cantikus

Cantikus Huber, 2018
Cantikus anaiensis (Yao & Li, 2016) — Indonesia (Sumatra)
Cantikus ballarini (Yao & Li, 2016) — Thailand
Cantikus cheni (Yao & Li, 2017) — Thailand
Cantikus chiangmaiensis (Yao & Li, 2016) — Thailand
Cantikus elongatus (Yin & Wang, 1981) — China, Laos
Cantikus erawan (Huber, 2011) — Thailand, Laos, Malaysia
Cantikus exceptus (Tong & Li, 2009) — China
Cantikus gou (Yao & Li, 2016) — Myanmar
Cantikus halabala (Huber, 2011) — Thailand to Singapore, Indonesia (Sumatra)
Cantikus khaolek (Huber, 2016) — Thailand
Cantikus kuhapimuk (Huber, 2016) — Thailand
Cantikus lintang (Huber, 2016) — Malaysia (Borneo)
Cantikus namou (Huber, 2011) — Laos
Cantikus pakse (Huber, 2011) — Laos
Cantikus phami (Yao, Pham & Li, 2015) — Vietnam
Cantikus pyu (Huber, 2011) — Myanmar
Cantikus sabah (Huber, 2011) — Malaysia (Borneo)
Cantikus sepaku (Huber, 2011) — Indonesia (Borneo)
Cantikus subwan (Yao & Li, 2017) — Thailand
Cantikus sudhami (Huber, 2011) — Thailand
Cantikus taptaoensis (Yao & Li, 2016) — Thailand
Cantikus tharnlodensis (Yao & Li, 2016) — Thailand
Cantikus ubin (Huber, 2016) — Singapore, Indonesia (Gaya Is.)
Cantikus v-notatus (Thorell, 1878) — Myanmar to Indonesia
Cantikus wan (Yao & Li, 2016) — Thailand
Cantikus youngae (Huber, 2011) — Thailand
Cantikus zhuchuandiani (Yao & Li, 2016) — Indonesia (Borneo)

Carapoia

Carapoia González-Sponga, 1998
 Carapoia abdita Huber, 2016 — Brazil
 Carapoia agilis Huber, 2018 — Brazil
 Carapoia alagoas Huber, 2016 — Brazil
 Carapoia bispina Huber, 2018 — Brazil
 Carapoia brescoviti Huber, 2005 — Brazil
 Carapoia cambridgei (Mello-Leitão, 1947) — Brazil
 Carapoia capixaba Huber, 2016 — Brazil
 Carapoia carvalhoi Huber, 2016 — Brazil
 Carapoia carybei Huber, 2016 — Brazil
 Carapoia crasto Huber, 2005 — Brazil
 Carapoia dandarae Huber, 2016 — Brazil
 Carapoia divisa Huber, 2016 — Brazil
 Carapoia djavani Huber, 2018 — Brazil
 Carapoia exigua Huber, 2018 — Brazi
 Carapoia fowleri Huber, 2000 — Brazil, Guyana?
 Carapoia genitalis (Moenkhaus, 1898) — Brazil
 Carapoia gracilis Huber, 2016 — Brazil
 Carapoia jiboia Huber, 2016 — Brazil
 Carapoia kaxinawa Huber, 2018 — Brazil
 Carapoia levii (Huber, 2000) — Brazil
 Carapoia lutea (Keyserling, 1891) — Brazil, Argentina
 Carapoia macacu Huber, 2016 — Brazil
 Carapoia maculata Huber, 2018 — Brazil
 Carapoia marceloi Huber, 2016 — Brazil
 Carapoia mirim Huber, 2016 — Brazil
 Carapoia munduruku Huber, 2018 — Brazil
 Carapoia nairae Huber, 2016 — Brazil
 Carapoia ocaina Huber, 2000 — Peru, Brazil
 Carapoia paraguaensis González-Sponga, 1998 (type) — Venezuela, Guyana, Brazil
 Carapoia patafina Huber, 2016 — Brazil
 Carapoia pau Huber, 2016 — Brazil
 Carapoia pulchra Huber, 2018 — Brazil
 Carapoia rheimsae Huber, 2005 — Brazil
 Carapoia rubra Huber, 2018 — Brazil
 Carapoia saltinho Huber, 2016 — Brazil
 Carapoia septentrionalis Huber, 2016 — Brazil
 Carapoia suassunai Huber, 2018 — Brazil
 Carapoia tapajos Huber, 2018 — Brazil
 Carapoia tenuis Huber, 2018 — Brazil
 Carapoia ubatuba Huber, 2005 — Brazil
 Carapoia una Huber, 2005 — Brazil
 Carapoia utinga Huber, 2018 — Brazil
 Carapoia viridis Huber, 2016 — Brazil
 Carapoia voltavelha Huber, 2016 — Brazil
 Carapoia zumbii Huber, 2016 — Brazil

Cenemus

Cenemus Saaristo, 2001
 Cenemus culiculus (Simon, 1898) (type) — Seychelles
 Cenemus mikehilli Saaristo, 2002 — Seychelles
 Cenemus silhouette Saaristo, 2001 — Seychelles

Chibchea

Chibchea Huber, 2000
Chibchea aberrans (Chamberlin, 1916) – Peru
Chibchea abiseo Huber, 2000 – Peru
Chibchea amapa Huber & Carvalho, 2019 – Brazil
Chibchea araona Huber, 2000 – Bolivia, Chile
Chibchea danielae Huber, 2020 – Venezuela
Chibchea elqui Huber, 2000 – Chile
Chibchea hamadae Huber & Carvalho, 2019 – Brazil
Chibchea ika Huber, 2000 (type) – Colombia
Chibchea malkini Huber, 2000 – Bolivia
Chibchea mapuche Huber, 2000 – Chile, Juan Fernandez Is.
Chibchea mateo Huber, 2000 – Peru
Chibchea mayna Huber, 2000 – Ecuador, Peru
Chibchea merida Huber, 2000 – Venezuela
Chibchea picunche Huber, 2000 – Chile
Chibchea salta Huber, 2000 – Argentina
Chibchea santosi Huber & Carvalho, 2019 – Brazil
Chibchea silvae Huber, 2000 – Peru
Chibchea thunbergae Huber, 2020 – Venezuela
Chibchea tunebo Huber, 2000 – Venezuela
Chibchea uru Huber, 2000 – Peru
Chibchea valle Huber, 2000 – Colombia

Chisosa

Chisosa Huber, 2000
 Chisosa baja (Gertsch, 1982) — Mexico
 Chisosa caquetio Huber, 2019 — Aruba, Curaçao
 Chisosa diluta (Gertsch & Mulaik, 1940) (type) — USA

Ciboneya

Ciboneya Pérez, 2001
 Ciboneya antraia Huber & Pérez, 2001 — Cuba
 Ciboneya nuriae Huber & Pérez, 2001 (type) — Cuba
 Ciboneya odilere Huber & Pérez, 2001 — Cuba
 Ciboneya parva Huber & Pérez, 2001 — Cuba

Coryssocnemis

Coryssocnemis Simon, 1893
 Coryssocnemis aripo Huber, 2000 — Trinidad
 Coryssocnemis callaica Simon, 1893 (type) — Venezuela
 Coryssocnemis clara Gertsch, 1971 — Mexico
 Coryssocnemis discolor Mello-Leitão, 1918 — Brazil
 Coryssocnemis faceta Gertsch, 1971 — Mexico
 Coryssocnemis guatopo Huber, 2000 — Venezuela
 Coryssocnemis iviei Gertsch, 1971 — Mexico
 Coryssocnemis lepidoptera Mello-Leitão, 1918 — Brazil
 Coryssocnemis monagas Huber, 2000 — Venezuela
 Coryssocnemis occulta Mello-Leitão, 1918 — Brazil
 Coryssocnemis simla Huber, 2000 — Trinidad
 Coryssocnemis tarsocurvipes (González-Sponga, 2003) — Venezuela
 Coryssocnemis tigra Huber, 1998 — Honduras
 Coryssocnemis viridescens Kraus, 1955 — El Salvador to Costa Rica

Crossopriza

Crossopriza Simon, 1893
 Crossopriza johncloudsleyi Deeleman-Reinhold & van Harten, 2001 — Yemen, Kenya
 Crossopriza lyoni (Blackwall, 1867) — Africa. Introduced to USA, Venezuela, Germany, China, Japan, Korea, tropical Asia, Australia
 Crossopriza maculipes (Spassky, 1934) — Kazakhstan, Uzbekistan, Turkmenistan, Tajikistan, Pakistan
 Crossopriza nigrescens Millot, 1946 — Madagascar
 Crossopriza pristina (Simon, 1890) (type) — Sudan, Yemen
 Crossopriza semicaudata (O. Pickard-Cambridge, 1876) — Egypt
 Crossopriza soudanensis Millot, 1941 — Mali, Burkina Faso

E

Enetea

Enetea Huber, 2000
 Enetea apatellata Huber, 2000 (type) — Bolivia

G

Galapa

Galapa Huber, 2000
 Galapa baerti (Gertsch & Peck, 1992) (type) — Ecuador (Galapagos Is.)
 Galapa bella (Gertsch & Peck, 1992) — Ecuador (Galapagos Is.)
 Galapa floreana Baert, 2014 — Ecuador (Galapagos Is.)

Gertschiola

Gertschiola Brignoli, 1981
 Gertschiola macrostyla (Mello-Leitão, 1941) (type) — Argentina
 Gertschiola neuquena Huber, 2000 — Argentina

Giloloa

Giloloa Huber, 2019
 Giloloa sofifi Huber, 2019 (type) — Indonesia (Halmahera, North Maluku)

Guaranita

Guaranita Huber, 2000
 Guaranita dobby Torres, Pardo, González-Reyes, Rodríguez Artigas & Corronca, 2016 — Argentina
 Guaranita goloboffi Huber, 2000 (type) — Argentina
 Guaranita munda (Gertsch, 1982) — Brazil, Argentina
 Guaranita yaculica Huber, 2000 — Argentina

H

Hantu

Hantu Huber, 2016
 Hantu kapit Huber, 2016 (type) — Borneo
 Hantu niah Huber, 2016 — Borneo

Holocneminus

Holocneminus Berland, 1942
 Holocneminus huangdi Tong & Li, 2009 — China
 Holocneminus multiguttatus (Simon, 1905) — Sri Lanka to Malaysia, Indonesia (Sulawesi)
 Holocneminus piritarsis Berland, 1942 (type) — Samoa, French Polynesia (Marquesas Is., Austral Is.), Henderson Is., Marshall Is.

Holocnemus

Holocnemus Simon, 1873
H. caudatus (Dufour, 1820) – Spain, Andorra
H. hispanicus Wiehle, 1933 – Portugal, Spain
H. pluchei (Scopoli, 1763) – Europe, North Africa, Turkey, Caucasus, Middle East. Introduced to USA, Argentina, Japan, Australia
H. reini (C. Koch, 1873) – Morocco, Algeria, Tunisia

Hoplopholcus

Hoplopholcus Kulczyński, 1908
Hoplopholcus asiaeminoris Brignoli, 1978 – Turkey
Hoplopholcus atik (Huber, 2020) – Turkey
Hoplopholcus bursa (Huber, 2020) – Turkey
Hoplopholcus cecconii Kulczyński, 1908 – Turkey, Israel, Lebanon
Hoplopholcus dim (Huber, 2020) – Turkey, Cyprus
Hoplopholcus figulus Brignoli, 1971 – Greece
Hoplopholcus forskali (Thorell, 1871) (type) – Eastern Europe to Turkmenistan
Hoplopholcus gazipasa (Huber, 2020) – Greece, Turkey
Hoplopholcus konya (Huber, 2020) – Turkey
Hoplopholcus labyrinthi (Kulczyński, 1903) – Greece (Crete)
Hoplopholcus longipes (Spassky, 1934) – Greece, Turkey, Caucasus (Russia, Georgia)
Hoplopholcus minotaurinus Senglet, 1971 – Greece (Crete)
Hoplopholcus minous Senglet, 1971 – Greece (Crete)
Hoplopholcus patrizii (Roewer, 1962) – Turkey
Hoplopholcus suluin (Huber, 2020) – Turkey
Hoplopholcus trakyaensis Demircan & Topçu, 2017 – Turkey (European part)

I

Ibotyporanga

Ibotyporanga Mello-Leitão, 1944
 Ibotyporanga diroa Huber & Brescovit, 2003 — Brazil
 Ibotyporanga emekori Huber & Brescovit, 2003 — Brazil
 Ibotyporanga naideae Mello-Leitão, 1944 (type) — Brazil
 Ibotyporanga ramosae Huber & Brescovit, 2003 — Brazil

Ixchela

Ixchela Huber, 2000
 Ixchela abernathyi (Gertsch, 1971) — Mexico
 Ixchela azteca Valdez-Mondragón & Francke, 2015 — Mexico
 Ixchela franckei Valdez-Mondragón, 2013 — Mexico
 Ixchela furcula (F. O. Pickard-Cambridge, 1902) (type) — Guatemala, Honduras, El Salvador
 Ixchela grix Valdez-Mondragón, 2013 — Mexico
 Ixchela huasteca Valdez-Mondragón, 2013 — Mexico
 Ixchela huberi Valdez-Mondragón, 2013 — Mexico
 Ixchela jalisco Valdez-Mondragón & Francke, 2015 — Mexico
 Ixchela juarezi Valdez-Mondragón, 2013 — Mexico
 Ixchela mendozai Valdez-Mondragón & Francke, 2015 — Mexico
 Ixchela mixe Valdez-Mondragón, 2013 — Mexico
 Ixchela pecki (Gertsch, 1971) — Mexico
 Ixchela placida (Gertsch, 1971) — Mexico
 Ixchela purepecha Valdez-Mondragón & Francke, 2015 — Mexico
 Ixchela santibanezi Valdez-Mondragón, 2013 — Mexico
 Ixchela simoni (O. Pickard-Cambridge, 1898) — Mexico
 Ixchela taxco Valdez-Mondragón, 2013 — Mexico
 Ixchela tlayuda Valdez-Mondragón & Francke, 2015 — Mexico
 Ixchela tzotzil Valdez-Mondragón, 2013 — Mexico
 Ixchela viquezi Valdez-Mondragón, 2013 — Honduras

K

Kairona

Kairona Huber & Carvalho, 2019
 Kairona selva Huber & Carvalho, 2019 (type) — Brazil

Kambiwa

Kambiwa Huber, 2000
 Kambiwa anomala (Mello-Leitão, 1918) — Brazil
 Kambiwa neotropica (Kraus, 1957) (type) — Brazil

Kelabita

Kelabita Huber, 2018
 Kelabita andulau (Huber, 2011) (type) — Borneo (Malaysia, Brunei)
 Kelabita lambir (Huber, 2016) — Malaysia (Borneo)

Khorata

Khorata Huber, 2005
 Khorata bachma Yao & Li, 2018 — Vietnam
 Khorata bangkok Huber, 2005 — Thailand, Laos
 Khorata bayeri Yao, Li & Jäger, 2014 — Thailand
 Khorata circularis Yao & Li, 2013 — Laos
 Khorata cucphuong Yao & Li, 2018 — Vietnam
 Khorata dangi Yao, Pham & Li, 2015 — Vietnam
 Khorata diaoluoshanensis Tong & Li, 2008 — China
 Khorata digitata Yao & Li, 2010 — China, Vietnam
 Khorata dongkou Yao & Li, 2010 — China
 Khorata dupla Yao & Li, 2013 — Laos
 Khorata epunctata Yao & Li, 2010 — China
 Khorata flabelliformis Yao & Li, 2010 — China
 Khorata fusui Zhang & Zhu, 2009 — China
 Khorata guiensis Yao & Li, 2010 — China
 Khorata huberi Yao, Pham & Li, 2015 — Vietnam
 Khorata jaegeri Huber, 2005 — Laos
 Khorata khammouan Huber, 2005 (type) — Laos
 Khorata liuzhouensis Yao & Li, 2010 — China
 Khorata luojinensis Yao & Li, 2010 — China
 Khorata macilenta Yao & Li, 2010 — China
 Khorata miaoshanensis Yao & Li, 2010 — China
 Khorata nanningensis Yao & Li, 2010 — China
 Khorata ningming Zhang & Zhu, 2009 — China
 Khorata ningyuan Wei & Xu, 2014 — China
 Khorata palace Yao & Li, 2018 — Vietnam
 Khorata paquini Yao & Li, 2010 — China
 Khorata protumida Yao, Pham & Li, 2015 — Vietnam
 Khorata quangbinh Yao & Li, 2018 — Vietnam
 Khorata robertmurphyi Yao & Li, 2010 — China
 Khorata rongshuiensis Yao & Li, 2010 — China
 Khorata sancai Wei & Xu, 2014 — China
 Khorata schwendingeri Huber, 2005 — Thailand, Laos
 Khorata shao Yao & Li, 2010 — China
 Khorata triangula Yao & Li, 2010 — China
 Khorata vinhphuc Yao & Li, 2018 — Vietnam
 Khorata wangae Yao & Li, 2010 — China
 Khorata xingyi Chen, Zhang & Zhu, 2009 — China
 Khorata zhui Zhang & Zhang, 2008 — China

Kintaqa

Kintaqa Huber, 2018
 Kintaqa buatong (Huber, 2016) (type) — Thailand
 Kintaqa fuza (Yao & Li, 2017) — Thailand
 Kintaqa mueangensis (Yao & Li, 2017) — Thailand
 Kintaqa satun (Huber, 2011) — Thailand, Malaysia
 Kintaqa schwendingeri (Huber, 2011) — Thailand

L

Leptopholcus

Leptopholcus Simon, 1893
 Leptopholcus borneensis Deeleman-Reinhold, 1986 — Thailand, Indonesia (Borneo, Lesser Sunda Is.)
 Leptopholcus budongo Huber, 2011 — Congo, Kenya, Uganda
 Leptopholcus debakkeri Huber, 2011 — Congo
 Leptopholcus dioscoridis Deeleman-Reinhold & van Harten, 2001 — Yemen (Socotra)
 Leptopholcus dschang Huber, 2011 — Cameroon
 Leptopholcus gabonicus Huber, 2014 — Gabon
 Leptopholcus gracilis Berland, 1920 — Somalia, Kenya, Tanzania, Mozambique, South Africa
 Leptopholcus griswoldi Huber, 2011 — Madagascar
 Leptopholcus guineensis Millot, 1941 — West Africa
 Leptopholcus gurnahi Huber, 2011 — Tanzania
 Leptopholcus huongson Huber, 2011 — China, Thailand, Vietnam
 Leptopholcus kandy Huber, 2011 — India, Sri Lanka
 Leptopholcus kintampo Huber & Kwapong, 2013 — Ghana
 Leptopholcus lokobe Huber, 2011 — Madagascar
 Leptopholcus ngazidja Huber, 2011 — Madagascar, Comoros
 Leptopholcus obo Huber, 2011 — São Tomé and Príncipe
 Leptopholcus podophthalmus (Simon, 1893) — Sri Lanka to China, Singapore
 Leptopholcus sakalavensis Millot, 1946 — Madagascar
 Leptopholcus signifer Simon, 1893 (type) — Angola, Kenya
 Leptopholcus talatakely Huber, 2011 — Madagascar
 Leptopholcus tanikawai Irie, 1999 — Japan, China
 Leptopholcus tipula (Simon, 1907) — West and Central Africa

Litoporus

Litoporus Simon, 1893
 Litoporus aerius Simon, 1893 (type) — Venezuela
 Litoporus agricola Mello-Leitão, 1922 — Brazil
 Litoporus dimona Huber, 2000 — Brazil
 Litoporus iguassuensis Mello-Leitão, 1918 — Brazil
 Litoporus lopez Huber, 2000 — Colombia
 Litoporus manu Huber, 2000 — Peru
 Litoporus pakitza Huber, 2000 — Peru
 Litoporus saul Huber, 2000 — French Guiana
 Litoporus secoya Huber, 2000 — Colombia
 Litoporus uncatus (Simon, 1893) — Northern South America
 Litoporus yucumo Huber, 2000 — Bolivia

M

Magana

Magana Huber, 2019
 Magana velox Huber, 2019 (type) — Oman

Mecolaesthus

Mecolaesthus Simon, 1893
 Mecolaesthus arima Huber, 2000 — Trinidad
 Mecolaesthus azulita Huber, 2000 — Venezuela
 Mecolaesthus cordiformis (González-Sponga, 2009) — Venezuela
 Mecolaesthus cornutus Huber, 2000 — Venezuela
 Mecolaesthus grandis (González-Sponga, 2009) — Venezuela
 Mecolaesthus hoti Huber, 2000 — Venezuela
 Mecolaesthus lemniscatus (Simon, 1894) — St. Vincent
 Mecolaesthus longissimus Simon, 1893 (type) — Venezuela
 Mecolaesthus mucuy Huber, 2000 — Venezuela
 Mecolaesthus multidenticulatus (González-Sponga, 2003) — Venezuela
 Mecolaesthus nigrifrons (Simon, 1894) — St. Vincent
 Mecolaesthus niquitanus (González-Sponga, 2011) — Venezuela
 Mecolaesthus peckorum Huber, 2000 — Venezuela
 Mecolaesthus puntiagudus (González-Sponga, 2003) — Venezuela
 Mecolaesthus putumayo Huber, 2000 — Colombia
 Mecolaesthus tabay Huber, 2000 — Venezuela
 Mecolaesthus taino Huber, 2000 — Guadeloupe, Dominica
 Mecolaesthus tuberculosus (González-Sponga, 2009) — Venezuela
 Mecolaesthus yawaperi Huber, 2000 — Brazil

Meraha

Meraha Huber, 2018
 Meraha chiangdao (Huber, 2011) — Thailand
 Meraha khene (Huber, 2011) — Laos, Vietnam
 Meraha kinabalu (Huber, 2011) — Malaysia (Borneo)
 Meraha kipungit (Huber, 2016) — Malaysia (Borneo)
 Meraha krabi (Huber, 2016) (type) — Thailand
 Meraha narathiwat (Huber, 2016) — Thailand
 Meraha shuye (Yao & Li, 2017) — Indonesia (Borneo)

Mesabolivar

Mesabolivar González-Sponga, 1998
 Mesabolivar acrensis Huber, 2018 — Brazil
 Mesabolivar amadoi Huber, 2018 — Brazil
 Mesabolivar amanaye Huber, 2018 — Brazil
 Mesabolivar amazonicus Huber, 2018 — Brazil
 Mesabolivar anseriformis (González-Sponga, 2011) — Venezuela
 Mesabolivar argentinensis (Mello-Leitão, 1938) — Argentina
 Mesabolivar aurantiacus (Mello-Leitão, 1930) — Northern South America
 Mesabolivar azureus (Badcock, 1932) — Brazil
 Mesabolivar baianus Huber, 2018 — Brazil
 Mesabolivar banksi (Moenkhaus, 1898) — Brazil
 Mesabolivar beckeri (Huber, 2000) — Brazil
 Mesabolivar bico Huber, 2018 — Brazil
 Mesabolivar bicuspis Huber, 2018 — Brazil
 Mesabolivar bonita Huber, 2015 — Brazil
 Mesabolivar borgesi Huber, 2018 — Argentina
 Mesabolivar botocudo Huber, 2000 — Brazil
 Mesabolivar brasiliensis (Moenkhaus, 1898) — Brazil
 Mesabolivar buraquinho Huber, 2018 — Brazil
 Mesabolivar caipora Huber, 2015 — Brazil
 Mesabolivar camacan Huber, 2018 — Brazil
 Mesabolivar camussi Machado, Yamamoto, Brescovit & Huber, 2007 — Brazil
 Mesabolivar cantharus Machado, Yamamoto, Brescovit & Huber, 2007 — Brazil
 Mesabolivar catarinensis Huber, 2018 — Brazil
 Mesabolivar cavicelatus Machado, Brescovit, Candiani & Huber, 2007 — Brazil
 Mesabolivar ceruleiventris (Mello-Leitão, 1916) — Brazil
 Mesabolivar chapeco Huber, 2018 — Brazil, Argentina
 Mesabolivar charrua Machado, Laborda, Simó & Brescovit, 2013 — Brazil, Uruguay
 Mesabolivar claricae Huber, 2018 — Brazil
 Mesabolivar constrictus Huber, 2018 — Brazil
 Mesabolivar cuarassu Huber, Brescovit & Rheims, 2005 — Brazil
 Mesabolivar cyaneomaculatus (Keyserling, 1891) — Brazil
 Mesabolivar cyaneotaeniatus (Keyserling, 1891) — Brazil
 Mesabolivar cyaneus (Taczanowski, 1874) — Venezuela, French Guiana, Guyana, Brazil
 Mesabolivar delclaroi Machado & Brescovit, 2012 — Brazil
 Mesabolivar difficilis (Mello-Leitão, 1918) — Brazil
 Mesabolivar eberhardi Huber, 2000 — Trinidad, Colombia, Venezuela, Peru, Brazil
 Mesabolivar embapua Machado, Brescovit & Francisco, 2007 — Brazil
 Mesabolivar exlineae (Mello-Leitão, 1947) — Peru
 Mesabolivar forceps Machado, Brescovit, Candiani & Huber, 2007 — Brazil
 Mesabolivar gabettae Huber, 2015 — Brazil
 Mesabolivar giupponii Huber, 2015 — Brazil
 Mesabolivar globulosus (Nicolet, 1849) — Chile, Argentina
 Mesabolivar goitaca Huber, 2015 — Brazil
 Mesabolivar guapiara Huber, 2000 — Brazil
 Mesabolivar guaycolec Huber, 2018 — Argentina
 Mesabolivar huambisa Huber, 2000 — Peru, Ecuador
 Mesabolivar huanuco Huber, 2000 — Peru
 Mesabolivar huberi Machado, Brescovit & Francisco, 2007 — Brazil
 Mesabolivar iguazu Huber, 2000 — Brazil, Argentina
 Mesabolivar inmanis Huber, 2018 — Brazil
 Mesabolivar inornatus Huber, 2015 — Brazil
 Mesabolivar itajai Huber, 2018 — Brazil
 Mesabolivar itapoa Huber, 2015 — Brazil
 Mesabolivar jamari Huber, 2018 — Brazil
 Mesabolivar junin Huber, 2000 — Peru
 Mesabolivar kaingang Huber, 2018 — Brazil
 Mesabolivar kathrinae Huber, 2015 — Brazil
 Mesabolivar locono Huber, 2000 — Suriname, Guyana
 Mesabolivar macushi Huber, 2018 — Venezuela
 Mesabolivar madalena Huber, 2018 — Brazil
 Mesabolivar mairyara Machado, Brescovit, Candiani & Huber, 2007 — Brazil
 Mesabolivar maraba Huber, 2018 — Brazil
 Mesabolivar maxacali Huber, 2000 — Brazil
 Mesabolivar mimoso Huber, 2018 — Brazil
 Mesabolivar monteverde Huber, 2015 — Brazil
 Mesabolivar murici Huber, 2018 — Brazil
 Mesabolivar nigridentis (Mello-Leitão, 1922) — Brazil
 Mesabolivar niteroi Huber, 2018 — Brazil
 Mesabolivar pallens Huber, 2018 — Brazil
 Mesabolivar paraensis (Mello-Leitão, 1947) — Brazil
 Mesabolivar pau Huber, 2015 — Brazil
 Mesabolivar perezi Huber, 2015 — Brazil
 Mesabolivar pseudoblechroscelis González-Sponga, 1998 (type) — Venezuela
 Mesabolivar rudilapsi Machado, Brescovit & Francisco, 2007 — Brazil
 Mesabolivar saci Huber, 2018 — Brazil
 Mesabolivar sai Huber, 2015 — Brazil
 Mesabolivar samatiaguassu Huber, Brescovit & Rheims, 2005 — Brazil
 Mesabolivar sepitus Huber, 2018 — Brazil
 Mesabolivar serrapelada Huber, 2018 — Brazil
 Mesabolivar similis Huber, 2018 — Brazil
 Mesabolivar simoni (Moenkhaus, 1898) — Brazil
 Mesabolivar spinosus (González-Sponga, 2005) — Venezuela
 Mesabolivar spinulosus (Mello-Leitão, 1939) — Brazil
 Mesabolivar tabatinga Huber, 2018 — Peru, Brazil
 Mesabolivar tamoio Huber, 2015 — Brazil
 Mesabolivar tandilicus (Mello-Leitão, 1940) — Uruguay, Argentina
 Mesabolivar tapajos Huber, 2018 — Brazil
 Mesabolivar togatus (Keyserling, 1891) — Brazil
 Mesabolivar turvo Huber, 2018 — Brazil
 Mesabolivar unicornis Huber, 2015 — Brazil
 Mesabolivar uruguayensis Machado, Laborda, Simó & Brescovit, 2013 — Brazil, Uruguay, Argentina
 Mesabolivar xingu Huber, 2000 — Brazil
 Mesabolivar yucuma Huber, 2018 — Brazil
 Mesabolivar yuruani (Huber, 2000) — Venezuela

Metagonia

Metagonia Simon, 1893
M. amica Gertsch, 1971 – Mexico
M. argentinensis Mello-Leitão, 1945 – Brazil, Argentina
M. asintal Huber, 1998 – Guatemala
M. atoyacae Gertsch, 1971 – Mexico
M. auberti Caporiacco, 1954 – French Guiana
M. belize Gertsch, 1986 – Guatemala, Belize
M. bella Gertsch, 1986 – Mexico
M. bellavista Gertsch & Peck, 1992 – Ecuador (Galapagos Is.)
M. beni Huber, 2000 – Peru, Bolivia, Brazil
M. berlanga Huber, 2022 – Ecuador (Galapagos Is.)
M. bicornis (Keyserling, 1891) – Brazil
M. bifida Simon, 1893 (type) – Brazil
M. blanda Gertsch, 1973 – Guatemala, Honduras
M. bonaldoa Huber, 2000 – Brazil
M. candela Gertsch, 1971 – Mexico
M. capilla Gertsch, 1971 – Mexico
M. cara Gertsch, 1986 – Belize
M. caudata O. Pickard-Cambridge, 1895 – USA to Belize
M. chiquita Gertsch, 1977 – Mexico
M. coahuila Gertsch, 1971 – Mexico
M. conica (Simon, 1893) – Venezuela
M. cuate Gertsch, 1986 – Mexico
M. debrasi Pérez & Huber, 1999 – Cuba
M. delicata (O. Pickard-Cambridge, 1895) – Mexico to Panama
M. diamantina Machado, Ferreira & Brescovit, 2011 – Brazil
M. duodecimpunctata Schmidt, 1971 – Ecuador
M. faceta Gertsch, 1986 – Mexico
M. flavipes Schmidt, 1971 – Ecuador
M. furcata Huber, 2000 – Brazil
M. globulosa Huber, 2000 – Peru, Bolivia
M. goodnighti Gertsch, 1977 – Mexico
M. guaga Gertsch, 1986 – Mexico
M. guianesa Huber, 2020 – Venezuela
M. guttata Huber, 2020 – Venezuela
M. heraldica Mello-Leitão, 1922 – Brazil
M. hitoy Huber, 1997 – Costa Rica
M. hondura Huber, 1997 – Costa Rica
M. iviei Gertsch, 1977 – Mexico
M. jamaica Gertsch, 1986 – Jamaica
M. jarmila Gertsch, 1973 – Belize
M. joya Gertsch, 1986 – Mexico
M. juliae González-Sponga, 2010 – Venezuela
M. lagrimas Huber, 2022 – Ecuador (Galapagos Is.)
M. lancetilla Huber, 1998 – Honduras
M. latigo Huber, 2020 – Venezuela
M. lepida Gertsch, 1986 – Mexico
M. lingua (Schmidt, 1956) – Colombia
M. luisa Gertsch, 1986 – Mexico
M. maldonado Huber, 2000 – Peru, Bolivia
M. mariguitarensis (González-Sponga, 1998) – Venezuela, Brazil, Peru
M. martha Gertsch, 1973 – Mexico
M. maximiliani Brignoli, 1972 – Mexico
M. maya Chamberlin & Ivie, 1938 – Mexico
M. mcnatti Gertsch, 1971 – Mexico
M. modesta Gertsch, 1986 – Mexico
M. modica Gertsch, 1986 – Guatemala
M. nadleri Huber, 2000 – Brazil
M. osa Gertsch, 1986 – Costa Rica
M. oxtalja Gertsch, 1986 – Mexico
M. pachona Gertsch, 1971 – Mexico
M. panama Gertsch, 1986 – Panama
M. paranapiacaba Huber, Rheims & Brescovit, 2005 – Brazil
M. petropolis Huber, Rheims & Brescovit, 2005 – Brazil
M. placida Gertsch, 1971 – Mexico
M. potiguar Ferreira, Souza, Machado & Brescovit, 2011 – Brazil
M. puebla Gertsch, 1986 – Mexico
M. punctata Gertsch, 1971 – Mexico
M. pura Gertsch, 1971 – Mexico
M. quadrifasciata Mello-Leitão, 1926 – Brazil
M. reederi Gertsch & Peck, 1992 – Ecuador (Galapagos Is.)
M. reventazona Huber, 1997 – Costa Rica, Panama
M. rica Gertsch, 1986 – Costa Rica, Panama
M. samiria Huber, 2000 – Peru
M. secreta Gertsch, 1971 – Mexico
M. selva Gertsch, 1986 – Costa Rica
M. serena Gertsch, 1971 – Mexico
M. striata Schmidt, 1971 – Guatemala
M. strinatii (Brignoli, 1972) – Argentina
M. suzanne Gertsch, 1973 – Mexico
M. talamanca Huber, 1997 – Costa Rica
M. taruma Huber, 2000 – Guyana, Brazil
M. tinaja Gertsch, 1971 – Mexico
M. tingo Huber, 2000 – Peru
M. tlamaya Gertsch, 1971 – Mexico
M. torete Gertsch, 1977 – Mexico
M. toro Huber, 1997 – Panama
M. triocular (González-Sponga, 2011) – Venezuela
M. unicolor (Keyserling, 1891) – Brazil
M. uvita Huber, 1997 – Costa Rica
M. yucatana Chamberlin & Ivie, 1938 – Mexico
M. zatoichi Huber, 2022 – Ecuador (Galapagos Is.)

Micromerys

Micromerys Bradley, 1877
 Micromerys baiteta Huber, 2011 — New Guinea
 Micromerys daviesae Deeleman-Reinhold, 1986 — Australia (Queensland)
 Micromerys gidil Huber, 2001 — Australia (Queensland)
 Micromerys gracilis Bradley, 1877 (type) — Australia (Northern Territory, Queensland)
 Micromerys gurran Huber, 2001 — Australia (Queensland)
 Micromerys papua Huber, 2011 — New Guinea
 Micromerys raveni Huber, 2001 — Australia (Queensland, New South Wales)
 Micromerys wigi Huber, 2001 — Australia (Queensland)
 Micromerys yidin Huber, 2001 — Australia (Queensland)

Micropholcus

Micropholcus Deeleman-Reinhold & Prinsen, 1987
Micropholcus agadir (Huber, 2011) – Morocco
Micropholcus baoruco (Huber, 2006) – Hispaniola
Micropholcus brazlandia (Huber, Pérez & Baptista, 2005) – Brazil
Micropholcus crato Huber, Carvalho & Benjamin, 2014 – Brazil
Micropholcus dalei (Petrunkevitch, 1929) – Puerto Rico, Virgin Is.
Micropholcus delicatulus (Franganillo, 1930) – Cuba
Micropholcus evaluna (Huber, Pérez & Baptista, 2005) – Venezuela
Micropholcus fauroti (Simon, 1887) (type) – Temperate Asia. Introduced to both Americas, Belgium, Germany, Africa, Sri Lanka, Southeast Asia, Australia, Pacific Is.
Micropholcus hispaniola (Huber, 2000) – Hispaniola
Micropholcus jacominae Deeleman-Reinhold & van Harten, 2001 – Yemen
Micropholcus jamaica (Huber, 2000) – Jamaica
Micropholcus pataxo (Huber, Pérez & Baptista, 2005) – Brazil
Micropholcus piaui Huber, Carvalho & Benjamin, 2014 – Brazil
Micropholcus piracuruca Huber, Carvalho & Benjamin, 2014 – Brazil
Micropholcus tegulifer (Barrientos, 2019) – Morocco
Micropholcus toma (Huber, 2006) – Hispaniola
Micropholcus ubajara Huber, Carvalho & Benjamin, 2014 – Brazil

Modisimus

Modisimus Simon, 1893
 Modisimus angulatus Huber & Fischer, 2010 — Hispaniola
 Modisimus bachata Huber & Fischer, 2010 — Hispaniola
 Modisimus beneficus Gertsch, 1973 — Mexico
 Modisimus berac Huber, 2010 — Hispaniola
 Modisimus boneti Gertsch, 1971 — Mexico
 Modisimus bribri Huber, 1998 — Costa Rica, Panama
 Modisimus cahuita Huber, 1998 — Costa Rica
 Modisimus caldera Huber, 1998 — Panama
 Modisimus cavaticus Petrunkevitch, 1929 — Puerto Rico
 Modisimus chiapa Gertsch, 1977 — Mexico
 Modisimus chickeringi Gertsch, 1973 — Panama
 Modisimus cienaga Huber & Fischer, 2010 — Hispaniola
 Modisimus coco Huber, 1998 — Costa Rica
 Modisimus coeruleolineatus Petrunkevitch, 1929 — Puerto Rico
 Modisimus concolor Bryant, 1940 — Cuba
 Modisimus cornutus Kraus, 1955 — Honduras
 Modisimus coxanus (Bryant, 1940) — Cuba
 Modisimus cuadro Huber & Fischer, 2010 — Hispaniola
 Modisimus culicinus (Simon, 1893) — South America. Introduced to Germany, Czech Rep., Zaire, Seychelles, Sri Lanka, Indonesia, China, Australia, Pacific Is.
 Modisimus david Huber, 1997 — Nicaragua, Panama
 Modisimus deltoroi Valdez-Mondragón & Francke, 2009 — Mexico
 Modisimus dilutus Gertsch, 1941 — Panama
 Modisimus dominical Huber, 1998 — Costa Rica
 Modisimus elevatus Bryant, 1940 — Cuba
 Modisimus elongatus Bryant, 1940 — Cuba
 Modisimus enriquillo Huber & Fischer, 2010 — Hispaniola
 Modisimus epepye Huber, 2010 — Hispaniola
 Modisimus femoratus Bryant, 1948 — Hispaniola
 Modisimus fuscus Bryant, 1948 — Hispaniola
 Modisimus glaucus Simon, 1893 (type) — Hispaniola, St. Vincent
 Modisimus globosus Schmidt, 1956 — Colombia
 Modisimus gracilipes Gertsch, 1973 — Guatemala
 Modisimus guatuso Huber, 1998 — Nicaragua to Panama
 Modisimus guerrerensis Gertsch & Davis, 1937 — Mexico
 Modisimus incertus (Bryant, 1940) — Cuba
 Modisimus inornatus O. Pickard-Cambridge, 1895 — Mexico
 Modisimus iviei Gertsch, 1973 — Mexico
 Modisimus ixobel Huber, 1998 — Guatemala
 Modisimus jima Huber & Fischer, 2010 — Hispaniola
 Modisimus kiskeya Huber & Fischer, 2010 — Hispaniola
 Modisimus leprete Huber, 2010 — Hispaniola
 Modisimus macaya Huber & Fischer, 2010 — Hispaniola
 Modisimus maculatipes O. Pickard-Cambridge, 1895 — Mexico
 Modisimus madreselva Huber, 1998 — Costa Rica
 Modisimus makandal Huber & Fischer, 2010 — Hispaniola
 Modisimus mango Huber, 2010 — Hispaniola
 Modisimus mariposas Huber & Fischer, 2010 — Hispaniola
 Modisimus mckenziei Gertsch, 1971 — Mexico
 Modisimus minima (González-Sponga, 2009) — Venezuela
 Modisimus miri Huber & Fischer, 2010 — Hispaniola
 Modisimus mitchelli Gertsch, 1971 — Mexico
 Modisimus modicus (Gertsch & Peck, 1992) — Ecuador (Galapagos Is.)
 Modisimus montanus Petrunkevitch, 1929 — Puerto Rico
 Modisimus montanus dentatus Petrunkevitch, 1929 — Puerto Rico
 Modisimus nicaraguensis Huber, 1998 — Nicaragua
 Modisimus ovatus Bryant, 1940 — Cuba
 Modisimus palenque Gertsch, 1977 — Mexico
 Modisimus palvet Huber & Fischer, 2010 — Hispaniola
 Modisimus pana Huber, 1998 — Guatemala
 Modisimus paraiso Huber, 2010 — Hispaniola
 Modisimus pavidus Bryant, 1940 — Cuba
 Modisimus pelejil Huber & Fischer, 2010 — Hispaniola
 Modisimus pittier Huber, 1998 — Costa Rica, Panama
 Modisimus propinquus O. Pickard-Cambridge, 1896 — Mexico
 Modisimus pulchellus Banks, 1929 — Panama
 Modisimus pusillus Gertsch, 1971 — Mexico
 Modisimus rainesi Gertsch, 1971 — Mexico
 Modisimus reddelli Gertsch, 1971 — Mexico
 Modisimus roumaini Huber, 2010 — Hispaniola
 Modisimus sanpedro Jiménez & Palacios-Cardiel, 2015 — Mexico
 Modisimus sanvito Huber, 1998 — Costa Rica
 Modisimus sarapiqui Huber, 1998 — Costa Rica
 Modisimus seguin Huber & Fischer, 2010 — Hispaniola
 Modisimus selvanegra Huber, 1998 — Nicaragua
 Modisimus sexoculatus Petrunkevitch, 1929 — Puerto Rico
 Modisimus signatus (Banks, 1914) — Puerto Rico
 Modisimus simoni Huber, 1997 — Venezuela
 Modisimus solus Gertsch & Peck, 1992 — Ecuador (Galapagos Is.)
 Modisimus texanus Banks, 1906 — USA, Mexico
 Modisimus tiburon Huber & Fischer, 2010 — Hispaniola
 Modisimus toma Huber & Fischer, 2010 — Hispaniola
 Modisimus tortuguero Huber, 1998 — Costa Rica
 Modisimus tzotzile Brignoli, 1974 — Mexico
 Modisimus vittatus Bryant, 1948 — Hispaniola

Muruta

Muruta Huber, 2018
 Muruta bario (Huber, 2016) — Malaysia (Borneo)
 Muruta tambunan (Huber, 2016) (type) — Malaysia (Borneo)

N

Nerudia

Nerudia Huber, 2000
 Nerudia atacama Huber, 2000 (type) — Chile, Argentina

Ninetis

Ninetis Simon, 1890
 Ninetis faro Huber, 2014 — Cameroon
 Ninetis minuta (Berland, 1920) — Somalia, Kenya, Tanzania
 Ninetis namibiae Huber, 2000 — Namibia
 Ninetis russellsmithi Huber, 2002 — Malawi
 Ninetis subtilissima Simon, 1890 (type) — Yemen
 Ninetis toliara Huber & El-Hennawy, 2007 — Madagascar

Nipisa

Nipisa Huber, 2018
 Nipisa anai (Huber, 2017) — Thailand, Malaysia (mainland), Singapore, Indonesia (Sumatra, Java?)
 Nipisa bankirai (Huber, 2017) — Malaysia, Indonesia (Borneo)
 Nipisa bidayuh (Huber, 2017) — Malaysia (Borneo)
 Nipisa deelemanae (Huber, 2011) — Malaysia (Borneo)
 Nipisa kubah (Huber, 2017) — Malaysia (Borneo)
 Nipisa lehi (Huber, 2017) — Malaysia (Borneo)
 Nipisa phasmoides (Deeleman-Reinhold, 1986) — Indonesia (Java, Sumatra, Borneo)
 Nipisa phyllicola (Deeleman-Reinhold, 1986) (type) — Thailand, Malaysia (mainland, Borneo), Indonesia (Sumatra, Borneo), Singapore
 Nipisa semengoh (Huber, 2011) — Malaysia (Borneo)
 Nipisa subphyllicola (Deeleman-Reinhold, 1986) — Philippines

Nita

Nita Huber & El-Hennawy, 2007
 Nita elsaff Huber & El-Hennawy, 2007 (type) — Egypt, Iran, Uzbekistan

Nyikoa

Nyikoa Huber, 2007
 Nyikoa limbe Huber, 2007 (type) — West, Central Africa

O

Ossinissa

Ossinissa Dimitrov & Ribera, 2005
 Ossinissa justoi (Wunderlich, 1992) (type) — Canary Is.

Otavaloa

Otavaloa Huber, 2000
 Otavaloa angotero Huber, 2000 (type) — Colombia, Ecuador, Peru
 Otavaloa lisei Huber, 2000 — Brazil
 Otavaloa otanabe Huber, 2000 — Peru
 Otavaloa pasco Huber, 2000 — Peru
 Otavaloa piro Huber, 2000 — Peru, Bolivia

P

Paiwana

Paiwana Huber, 2018
 Paiwana chengpoi (Huber & Dimitrov, 2014) — Taiwan
 Paiwana pingtung (Huber & Dimitrov, 2014) (type) — Taiwan

Panjange

Panjange Deeleman-Reinhold & Deeleman, 1983
 Panjange alba Deeleman-Reinhold & Deeleman, 1983 — Indonesia (Sulawesi, Ambon)
 Panjange bukidnon Huber, 2015 — Philippines
 Panjange camiguin Huber, 2015 — Philippines
 Panjange casaroro Huber, 2015 — Philippines
 Panjange cavicola Deeleman-Reinhold & Deeleman, 1983 — Indonesia (Sulawesi)
 Panjange dinagat Huber, 2015 — Philippines
 Panjange dubia (Kulczyński, 1911) — New Guinea
 Panjange hamiguitan Huber, 2015 — Philippines
 Panjange isarog Huber, 2015 — Philippines
 Panjange lanthana Deeleman-Reinhold & Deeleman, 1983 (type) — Philippines
 Panjange madang Huber, 2011 — New Guinea
 Panjange malagos Huber, 2015 — Philippines
 Panjange marilog Huber, 2015 — Philippines
 Panjange mirabilis Deeleman-Reinhold, 1986 — Australia (Queensland)
 Panjange thomi Huber, 2019 — Indonesia (West Papua)
 Panjange togutil Huber, 2019 — Indonesia (Halmahera, North Maluku)

Papiamenta

Papiamenta Huber, 2000
 Papiamenta levii (Gertsch, 1982) (type) — Curaçao
 Papiamenta savonet Huber, 2000 — Curaçao

Paramicromerys

Paramicromerys Millot, 1946
 Paramicromerys betsileo Huber, 2003 — Madagascar
 Paramicromerys coddingtoni Huber, 2003 — Madagascar
 Paramicromerys combesi (Millot, 1946) — Madagascar
 Paramicromerys madagascariensis (Simon, 1893) (type) — Madagascar
 Paramicromerys mahira Huber, 2003 — Madagascar
 Paramicromerys manantenina Huber, 2003 — Madagascar
 Paramicromerys marojejy Huber, 2003 — Madagascar
 Paramicromerys megaceros (Millot, 1946) — Madagascar
 Paramicromerys nampoinai Huber, 2003 — Madagascar
 Paramicromerys quinteri Huber, 2003 — Madagascar
 Paramicromerys rabeariveloi Huber, 2003 — Madagascar
 Paramicromerys ralamboi Huber, 2003 — Madagascar
 Paramicromerys rothorum Huber, 2003 — Madagascar
 Paramicromerys scharffi Huber, 2003 — Madagascar

Pehrforsskalia

Pehrforsskalia Deeleman-Reinhold & van Harten, 2001
 Pehrforsskalia bilene Huber, 2011 — Mozambique
 Pehrforsskalia conopyga Deeleman-Reinhold & van Harten, 2001 (type) — Africa, Yemen, Israel, Madagascar
 Pehrforsskalia shambaa Huber, 2011 — Tanzania

Pemona

Pemona Huber, 2019
 Pemona sapo Huber, 2019 (type) — Venezuela

Pholcitrichocyclus

Pholcitrichocyclus Simon, 1908
Pholcitrichocyclus arabana (Huber, 2001) – Australia (Western Australia, Northern Territory, South Australia)
Pholcitrichocyclus aranda (Huber, 2001) – Australia (Western Australia, Northern Territory)
Pholcitrichocyclus arawari (Huber, 2001) – Australia (Western Australia)
Pholcitrichocyclus arnga (Huber, 2001) – Australia (Western Australia)
Pholcitrichocyclus balladong (Huber, 2001) – Australia (Western Australia)
Pholcitrichocyclus bugai (Huber, 2001) – Australia (Western Australia)
Pholcitrichocyclus djauan (Huber, 2001) – Australia (Northern Territory)
Pholcitrichocyclus gnalooma (Huber, 2001) – Australia (Western Australia)
Pholcitrichocyclus grayi (Huber, 2001) – Australia (Northern Territory)
Pholcitrichocyclus harveyi (Huber, 2001) – Australia (Western Australia)
Pholcitrichocyclus hirsti (Huber, 2001) – Australia (South Australia)
Pholcitrichocyclus kokata (Huber, 2001) – Australia (South Australia)
Pholcitrichocyclus kurara (Huber, 2001) – Australia (Western Australia)
Pholcitrichocyclus nigropunctatus (Simon, 1908) (type) – Australia (Western Australia)
Pholcitrichocyclus nullarbor (Huber, 2001) – Australia (Western Australia, South Australia)
Pholcitrichocyclus oborindi (Huber, 2001) – Australia (Queensland)
Pholcitrichocyclus pandima (Huber, 2001) – Australia (Western Australia)
Pholcitrichocyclus pustulatus (Deeleman-Reinhold), 1995 – Australia (Queensland)
Pholcitrichocyclus septentrionalis (Deeleman-Reinhold, 1993) – Australia (Western Australia)
Pholcitrichocyclus ungumi (Huber, 2001) – Australia (Western Australia)
Pholcitrichocyclus warianga (Huber, 2001) – Australia (Western Australia)
Pholcitrichocyclus watta (Huber, 2001) – Australia (Northern Territory)
Pholcitrichocyclus worora (Huber, 2001) – Australia (Western Australia)

Pholcophora

Pholcophora Banks, 1896
 Pholcophora americana Banks, 1896 (type) — USA, Canada
 Pholcophora bahama Gertsch, 1982 — Bahama Is.
 Pholcophora maria Gertsch, 1977 — Mexico
 Pholcophora mexcala Gertsch, 1982 — Mexico
 Pholcophora texana Gertsch, 1935 — USA, Mexico

Pholcus

Pholcus Walckenaer, 1805
 Pholcus abstrusus Yao & Li, 2012 — China
 Pholcus acutulus Paik, 1978 — Korea
 Pholcus aduncus Yao & Li, 2012 — China
 Pholcus afghanus Senglet, 2008 — Afghanistan
 Pholcus agilis Yao & Li, 2012 — China
 Pholcus alagarkoil (Huber, 2011) — India
 Pholcus alloctospilus Zhu & Gong, 1991 — China
 Pholcus alpinus Yao & Li, 2012 — China
 Pholcus alticeps Spassky, 1932 — Poland to Russia, Iran
 Pholcus amani Huber, 2011 — Tanzania
 Pholcus anachoreta Dimitrov & Ribera, 2006 — Canary Islands
 Pholcus ancoralis L. Koch, 1865 — Ryukyu Islands to Hawaii, New Caledonia, Marquesas Islands, Rapa
 Pholcus anlong Chen, Zhang & Zhu, 2011 — China
 Pholcus arayat Huber, 2011 — Philippines
 Pholcus arcuatilis Yao & Li, 2013 — Laos
 Pholcus arkit Huber, 2011 — Central Asia
 Pholcus armeniacus Senglet, 1974 — Iran
 Pholcus arsacius Senglet, 2008 — Iran
 Pholcus attuleh Huber, 2011 — Cameroon
 Pholcus auricularis Zhang, Zhang & Liu, 2016 — China
 Pholcus babao Tong & Li, 2010 — China
 Pholcus baguio Huber, 2016 — Philippines
 Pholcus bailongensis Yao & Li, 2012 — China
 Pholcus bajia (Lu, Yao & He, 2022) — China
 Pholcus baka Huber, 2011 — West, Central Africa
 Pholcus bakweri Huber, 2011 — Bioko, Cameroon
 Pholcus baldiosensis Wunderlich, 1992 — Canary Islands
 Pholcus bamboutos Huber, 2011 — Cameroon
 Pholcus bangfai Huber, 2011 — Laos
 Pholcus bantouensis Yao & Li, 2012 — China
 Pholcus bat Lan & Li, 2021 — China
 Pholcus batepa Huber, 2011 — Sao Tome
 Pholcus beijingensis Zhu & Song, 1999 — China
 Pholcus berlandi Millot, 1941 — Senegal
 Pholcus bessus Zhu & Gong, 1991 — China
 Pholcus bicornutus Simon, 1892 — Philippines
 Pholcus bidentatus Zhu et al., 2005 — China, Laos
 Pholcus bifidus Yao, Pham & Li, 2015 — Vietnam
 Pholcus bikilai Huber, 2011 — Ethiopia
 Pholcus bimbache Dimitrov & Ribera, 2006 — Canary Islands
 Pholcus bing Yao & Li, 2012 — China
 Pholcus bolikhamsai Huber, 2011 — Laos
 Pholcus bourgini Millot, 1941 — Guinea
 Pholcus brevis Yao & Li, 2012 — China
 Pholcus bulacanensis Yao & Li, 2017 — Philippines (Luzon)
 Pholcus caecus Yao, Pham & Li, 2015 — Vietnam
 Pholcus calcar Wunderlich, 1987 — Canary Islands
 Pholcus calligaster Thorell, 1895 — Myanmar, Nepal
 Pholcus camba Huber, 2011 — Sulawesi
 Pholcus caspius Senglet, 2008 — Iran
 Pholcus ceheng Chen, Zhang & Zhu, 2011 — China
 Pholcus cenranaensis Yao & Li, 2016 — Indonesia (Sulawesi)
 Pholcus ceylonicus O. Pickard-Cambridge, 1869 — Sri Lanka, possibly Malaysia
 Pholcus chang Yao & Li, 2012 — China
 Pholcus changchi Yao, Li & Lu, 2022 — China
 Pholcus chappuisi Fage, 1936 — Kenya
 Pholcus chattoni Millot, 1941 — Guinea, Ivory Coast
 Pholcus cheaha Huber, 2011 — USA
 Pholcus chengde Yao, Li & Lu, 2022 — China
 Pholcus cheongogensis Kim & Ye, 2015 — Korea
 Pholcus chevronus Yin, Xu & Bao, 2012 — China
 Pholcus chiakensis  Seo, 2014 — Korea
 Pholcus chicheng Tong & Li, 2010 — China
 Pholcus chilgapsanensis J. G. Lee & J. H. Lee, 2021 — Korea
 Pholcus choctaw Huber, 2011 — USA
 Pholcus chuncheonensis J. G. Lee, Choi & S. K. Kim, 2021 — Korea
 Pholcus circularis Kraus, 1960 — Sao Tome
 Pholcus clavatus Schenkel, 1936 — China
 Pholcus clavimaculatus Zhu & Song, 1999 — China
 Pholcus cophenius Senglet, 2008 — Afghanistan
 Pholcus corcho Wunderlich, 1987 — Canary Islands
 Pholcus corniger Dimitrov & Ribera, 2006 — Canary Islands
 Pholcus crassipalpis Spassky, 1937 — Bulgaria, Ukraine, Russia (Europe, Caucasus), Turkey, Kazakhstan
 Pholcus crassus Paik, 1978 — Korea
 Pholcus creticus Senglet, 1971 — Crete
 Pholcus crypticolenoides Kim, Lee & Lee, 2015 — Korea
 Pholcus crypticolens Bösenberg & Strand, 1906 — Japan
 Pholcus cuneatus Yao & Li, 2012 — China
 Pholcus curvus Zhang, Zhang & Liu, 2016 — China
 Pholcus dade Huber, 2011 — USA
 Pholcus dali Zhang & Zhu, 2009 — China
 Pholcus datan Tong & Li, 2010 — China
 Pholcus datong (Yao, Li & Lu, 2022) — China
 Pholcus debilis (Thorell, 1899) — Bioko, Cameroon
 Pholcus decorus Yao & Li, 2012 — China
 Pholcus dentatus Wunderlich, 1995 — Madeira
 Pholcus deunggolensis Kim & Kim, 2016 — Korea
 Pholcus dieban Yao & Li, 2012 — China
 Pholcus difengensis Yao & Li, 2016 — China
 Pholcus dixie Huber, 2011 — USA
 Pholcus djelalabad Senglet, 2008 — Afghanistan, India
 Pholcus dongxue Yao & Li, 2017 — Thailand
 Pholcus doucki Huber, 2011 — Guinea
 Pholcus duan Yao & Li, 2017 — Thailand
 Pholcus dungara Huber, 2001 — Queensland
 Pholcus edentatus Campos & Wunderlich, 1995 — Canary Islands
 Pholcus elymaeus Senglet, 2008 — Iran
 Pholcus exilis Tong & Li, 2010 — China
 Pholcus extumidus Paik, 1978 — Korea, Japan
 Pholcus fagei (Kratochvíl, 1940) — Kenya
 Pholcus faveauxi (Lawrence, 1967) — Congo
 Pholcus fengcheng Zhang & Zhu, 2009 — China
 Pholcus fengning (Yao, Li & Lu, 2022) — China
 Pholcus foliaceus Peng & Zhang, 2013 — China
 Pholcus fragillimus Strand, 1907 — Sri Lanka, India to Japan
 Pholcus fuerteventurensis Wunderlich, 1992 — Canary Islands, Morocco
 Pholcus gaizhou Yao & Li, 2021 — China
 Pholcus gajiensis Seo, 2014 — Korea
 Pholcus ganziensis Yao & Li, 2012 — China
 Pholcus gaoi Song & Ren, 1994 — China
 Pholcus genuiformis Wunderlich, 1995 — Algeria
 Pholcus gomerae Wunderlich, 1980 — Canary Islands
 Pholcus gonggarensis Yao & Li, 2016 — China
 Pholcus gosuensis Kim & Lee, 2004 — Korea
 Pholcus gracillimus Thorell, 1890 — Malaysia, Singapore, Sumatra, Java
 Pholcus guadarfia Dimitrov & Ribera, 2007 — Canary Islands
 Pholcus guangling (Yao, Li & Lu, 2022) — China
 Pholcus guani Song & Ren, 1994 — China
 Pholcus guanshui Yao & Li, 2021 — China
 Pholcus gui Zhu & Song, 1999 — China
 Pholcus guineensis Millot, 1941 — Guinea, Sierra Leone
 Pholcus hamaensis Yao & Li, 2016 — China
 Pholcus hamatus Tong & Ji, 2010 — China
 Pholcus hamuchal Yao & Li, 2020 — Pakistan
 Pholcus harveyi Zhang & Zhu, 2009 — China
 Pholcus helenae Wunderlich, 1987 — Canary Islands
 Pholcus henanensis Zhu & Mao, 1983 — China
 Pholcus hieroglyphicus Pavesi, 1883 — Eritrea
 Pholcus higoensis Irie & Ono, 2008 — Japan
 Pholcus hinsonensis Yao & Li, 2016 — Thailand
 Pholcus hochiminhi Yao, Pham & Li, 2015 — Vietnam
 Pholcus hoyo Huber, 2011 — Congo
 Pholcus huailai Yao, Li & Lu, 2022 — China
 Pholcus huapingensis Yao & Li, 2012 — China
 Pholcus huberi Zhang & Zhu, 2009 — China
 Pholcus hunyuan (Yao, Li & Lu, 2022) — China
 Pholcus huoxiaerensis Yao & Li, 2016 — China
 Pholcus hyrcanus Senglet, 1974 — Iran
 Pholcus hytaspus Senglet, 2008 — Iran
 Pholcus imbricatus Yao & Li, 2012 — China
 Pholcus incheonensis J. G. Lee & J. H. Lee, 2021 — Korea
 Pholcus intricatus Dimitrov & Ribera, 2003 — Canary Islands
 Pholcus jaegeri Huber, 2011 — Laos
 Pholcus jiaotu Yao & Li, 2012 — China
 Pholcus jiguanshan Yao & Li, 2021 — China
 Pholcus jindongensis Seo, 2018 — Korea
 Pholcus jingnan Yao & Li, 2020 — China
 Pholcus jingyangensis Yao & Li, 2016 — China
 Pholcus jinniu Tong & Li, 2010 — China
 Pholcus jinwum Huber, 2001 — Queensland
 Pholcus jiulong Tong & Li, 2010 — China
 Pholcus jiuwei Tong & Ji, 2010 — China China
 Pholcus jixianensis Zhu & Yu, 1983 — China
 Pholcus joreongensis Seo, 2004 — Korea
 Pholcus jusahi Huber, 2011 — USA
 Pholcus juwangensis Seo, 2014 — Korea
 Pholcus kaebyaiensis Yao & Li, 2016 — Thailand
 Pholcus kakum Huber, 2009 — Ghana, Ivory Coast, Guinea, Congo
 Pholcus kalam Yao & Li, 2020 — Pakistan
 Pholcus kamkaly Huber, 2011 — Kazakhstan
 Pholcus kandahar Senglet, 2008 — Afghanistan
 Pholcus kangding Zhang & Zhu, 2009 — China
 Pholcus kapuri Tikader, 1977 — Andaman Islands
 Pholcus karawari Huber, 2011 — New Guinea
 Pholcus kawit Huber, 2016 — Philippines
 Pholcus kihansi Huber, 2011 — Tanzania
 Pholcus kimi Song & Zhu, 1994 — China, Laos
 Pholcus kindia Huber, 2011 — Guinea
 Pholcus kingi Huber, 2011 — USA
 Pholcus knoeseli Wunderlich, 1992 — Canary Islands
 Pholcus koah Huber, 2001 — Queensland
 Pholcus koasati Huber, 2011 — USA
 Pholcus kohi Huber, 2011 — Malaysia, Singapore, Sumatra
 Pholcus krachensis Yao & Li, 2016 — Thailand
 Pholcus kribi Huber, 2011 — Cameroon
 Pholcus kuaile (Yao, Li & Lu, 2022) — China
 Pholcus kui Yao & Li, 2012 — China
 Pholcus kunming Zhang & Zhu, 2009 — China
 Pholcus kwamgumi Huber, 2011 — Kenya, Tanzania
 Pholcus kwanaksanensis Namkung & Kim, 1990 — Korea
 Pholcus kwangkyosanensis Kim & Park, 2009 — Korea
 Pholcus kyondo Huber, 2011 — Congo
 Pholcus laksao Huber, 2011 — Laos
 Pholcus lamperti Strand, 1907 — Tanzania, possibly Zanzibar
 Pholcus langensis Yao & Li, 2016 — China
 Pholcus lanieri Huber, 2011 — USA
 Pholcus leruthi Lessert, 1935 — Congo, East Africa
 Pholcus lexuancanhi Yao, Pham & Li, 2012 — Vietnam
 Pholcus lijiangensis Yao & Li, 2012 — China
 Pholcus lilangai Huber, 2011 — Tanzania
 Pholcus lingguanensis Yao & Li, 2016 — China
 Pholcus lingulatus Gao, Gao & Zhu, 2002 — China
 Pholcus linzhou Zhang & Zhang, 2000 — China
 Pholcus liui Yao & Li, 2012 — China
 Pholcus liutu Yao & Li, 2012 — China
 Pholcus longlin Yao & Li, 2020 — China
 Pholcus longus Yao & Li, 2016 — China
 Pholcus longxigu Yao & Li, 2021 — China
 Pholcus lualaba Huber, 2011 — Congo
 Pholcus luanping (Yao & Li, 2022) — China
 Pholcus luding Tong & Li, 2010 — China
 Pholcus luki Huber, 2011 — Congo
 Pholcus luoquanbei Yao & Li, 2021 — China
 Pholcus lupanga Huber, 2011 — Tanzania
 Pholcus luya Peng & Zhang, 2013 — China
 Pholcus madeirensis Wunderlich, 1987 — Madeira
 Pholcus magnus Wunderlich, 1987 — Madeira
 Pholcus malpaisensis Wunderlich, 1992 — Canary Islands
 Pholcus manueli Gertsch, 1937 — Kazakhstan, Turkmenistan, Russia (Far East), China, Korea, Japan. Introduced to USA
 Pholcus mao Yao & Li, 2012 — China
 Pholcus maronita Brignoli, 1977 — Lebanon
 Pholcus mascaensis Wunderlich, 1987 — Canary Islands
 Pholcus maxian Lu, Yang & He, 2021 — China
 Pholcus mazumbai Huber, 2011 — Tanzania
 Pholcus mbuti Huber, 2011 — Congo
 Pholcus mecheria Huber, 2011 — Algeria
 Pholcus medicus Senglet, 1974 — Iran
 Pholcus medog Zhang, Zhu & Song, 2006 — China, India
 Pholcus mengla Song & Zhu, 1999 — China
 Pholcus mentawir Huber, 2011 — Borneo
 Pholcus metta Huber, 2019 — Sri Lanka
 Pholcus mianshanensis Zhang & Zhu, 2009 — China
 Pholcus mirabilis Yao & Li, 2012 — China
 Pholcus mixiaoqii Xu, Zhang & Yao, 2019 — China
 Pholcus moca Huber, 2011 — Bioko, Cameroon
 Pholcus montanus Paik, 1978 — Korea
 Pholcus multidentatus Wunderlich, 1987 — Canary Islands
 Pholcus mulu Huber, 2016 — Philippines
 Pholcus muralicola Maughan & Fitch, 1976 — USA
 Pholcus musensis Yao & Li, 2016 — Thailand
 Pholcus nagasakiensis Strand, 1918 — Japan
 Pholcus namkhan Huber, 2011 — Laos
 Pholcus negara Huber, 2011 — Bali
 Pholcus nenjukovi Spassky, 1936 — Central Asia
 Pholcus ningan Yao & Li, 2018 — China
 Pholcus nkoetye Huber, 2011 — Cameroon
 Pholcus nodong Huber, 2011 — Korea
 Pholcus obscurus Yao & Li, 2012 — China
 Pholcus oculosus Zhang & Zhang, 2000 — China
 Pholcus okgye Huber, 2011 — Korea
 Pholcus olangapo Huber, 2016 — Philippines
 Pholcus opilionoides (Schrank, 1781) — Europe to Azerbaijan
 Pholcus ornatus Bösenberg, 1895 — Canary Islands
 Pholcus otomi Huber, 2011 — Japan
 Pholcus ovatus Yao & Li, 2012 — China
 Pholcus pagbilao Huber, 2011 — Philippines
 Pholcus pajuensis J. G. Lee, Choi & S. K. Kim, 2021 — Korea
 Pholcus palgongensis Seo, 2014 — Korea
 Pholcus papilionis Peng & Zhang, 2011 — China
 Pholcus papillatus Zhang, Zhang & Liu, 2016 — China
 Pholcus paralinzhou Zhang & Zhu, 2009 — China
 Pholcus parayichengicus Zhang & Zhu, 2009 — China
 Pholcus parkyeonensis Kim & Yoo, 2009 — Korea
 Pholcus parthicus Senglet, 2008 — Iran
 Pholcus parvus Wunderlich, 1987 — Madeira
 Pholcus pennatus Zhang, Zhu & Song, 2005 — China
 Pholcus persicus Senglet, 1974 — Iran
 Pholcus phalangioides (Fuesslin, 1775) — Cosmopolitan
 Pholcus phnombak Lan, Jäger & Li, 2021 — Cambodia
 Pholcus phoenixus Zhang & Zhu, 2009 — China
 Pholcus phungiformes Oliger, 1983 — Russia
 Pholcus piagolensis Seo, 2018 — Korea
 Pholcus ping Yao & Li, 2017 — Vietnam
 Pholcus pocheonensis J. G. Lee, Choi & S. K. Kim, 2021 — Korea
 Pholcus pojeonensis Kim & Yoo, 2008 — Korea
 Pholcus ponticus Thorell, 1875 — Romania, Bulgaria to China
 Pholcus punu Huber, 2014 — Gabon
 Pholcus puranappui Huber, 2019 — Sri Lanka
 Pholcus pyeongchangensis Seo, 2018 — Korea
 Pholcus qingchengensis Gao, Gao & Zhu, 2002 — China
 Pholcus qingyunensis Yao & Li, 2016 — China
 Pholcus quinghaiensis Song & Zhu, 1999 — China
 Pholcus rawiriae Huber, 2014 — Gabon
 Pholcus reevesi Huber, 2011 — USA
 Pholcus roquensis Wunderlich, 1992 — Canary Islands
 Pholcus ruteng Huber, 2011 — Flores
 Pholcus saaristoi Zhang & Zhu, 2009 — China
 Pholcus saidovi Yao & Li, 2017 — Tajikistan
 Pholcus sakaew Yao & Li, 2018 — Thailand
 Pholcus schawalleri Yao, Li & Jäger, 2014 — Philippines
 Pholcus seokmodoensis J. G. Lee & J. H. Lee, 2021 — China
 Pholcus seorakensis Seo, 2018 — Korea
 Pholcus seoulensis J. G. Lee & J. H. Lee, 2021 — Korea
 Pholcus shangrila Zhang & Zhu, 2009 — China
 Pholcus shenshi Yao & Li, 2021 — Korea
 Pholcus shuangtu Yao & Li, 2012 — China
 Pholcus shuguanensis Yao & Li, 2017 — Tajikistan
 Pholcus sidorenkoi Dunin, 1994 — Russia, Tajikistan
 Pholcus silvai Wunderlich, 1995 — Madeira
 Pholcus simbok Huber, 2011 — Korea
 Pholcus socheunensis Paik, 1978 — Korea
 Pholcus sogdianae Brignoli, 1978 — Central Asia
 Pholcus sokkrisanensis Paik, 1978 — Korea
 Pholcus songi Zhang & Zhu, 2009 — China
 Pholcus songkhonensis Yao & Li, 2016 — Thailand
 Pholcus songxian Zhang & Zhu, 2009 — China
 Pholcus soukous Huber, 2011 — Congo
 Pholcus spasskyi Brignoli, 1978 — Turkey
 Pholcus spiliensis Wunderlich, 1995 — Crete
 Pholcus spilis Zhu & Gong, 1991 — China
 Pholcus steineri Huber, 2011 — Laos
 Pholcus strandi Caporiacco, 1941 — Ethiopia
 Pholcus sublaksao Yao & Li, 2013 — Laos
 Pholcus sublingulatus Zhang & Zhu, 2009 — China
 Pholcus suboculosus Peng & Zhang, 2011 — China
 Pholcus subwuyiensis Zhang & Zhu, 2009 — China
 Pholcus suizhongicus Zhu & Song, 1999 — China
 Pholcus sumatraensis Wunderlich, 1995 — Sumatra
 Pholcus suraksanensis J. G. Lee & J. H. Lee, 2021 — Korea
 Pholcus sveni Wunderlich, 1987 — Canary Islands
 Pholcus taarab Huber, 2011 — Tanzania, Malawi
 Pholcus taibaiensis Wang & Zhu, 1992 — China
 Pholcus taibeli Caporiacco, 1949 — Ethiopia
 Pholcus taishan Song & Zhu, 1999 — China
 Pholcus taita Huber, 2011 — Kenya
 Pholcus tang (Yao & Li, 2012) — China
 Pholcus tangyuensis Yao & Li, 2016  — China
 Pholcus tenerifensis Wunderlich, 1987 — Canary Islands
 Pholcus thakek Huber, 2011 — Laos
 Pholcus tianmenshan Yao & Li, 2021 — China
 Pholcus tianmuensis Yao & Li, 2016 — China
 Pholcus tongi Yao & Li, 2012 — China
 Pholcus tongyaoi Wang & Yao, 2020 — China
 Pholcus triangulatus Zhang & Zhang, 2000 — China
 Pholcus tuoyuan Yao & Li, 2012 — China
 Pholcus turcicus Wunderlich, 1980 — Turkey
 Pholcus tuyan Yao & Li, 2012 — China
 Pholcus twa Huber, 2011 — East Africa
 Pholcus uiseongensis Seo, 2018 — Korea
 Pholcus umphang Yao & Li, 2018 — Thailand
 Pholcus unaksanensis J. G. Lee, Choi & S. K. Kim, 2021 — Korea
 Pholcus undatus Yao & Li, 2012 — China
 Pholcus uva Huber, 2019 — Sri Lanka
 Pholcus varirata Huber, 2011 — New Guinea
 Pholcus vatovae Caporiacco, 1940 — East Africa
 Pholcus velitchkovskyi Kulczynski, 1913 — Russia, Ukraine, Iran
 Pholcus vietnamensis Yao & Li, 2017 — Vietnam
 Pholcus viveki Sen et al., 2015 — China
 Pholcus wahehe Huber, 2011 — Tanzania
 Pholcus wangi Yao & Li, 2012 — China
 Pholcus wangjiang Yao & Li, 2021 — China
 Pholcus wangtian Tong & Ji, 2010 — China
 Pholcus wangxidong Zhang & Zhu, 2009 — China
 Pholcus woongil Huber, 2011 — Korea
 Pholcus wuling Tong & Li, 2010 — China
 Pholcus wuyiensis Zhu & Gong, 1991 — China
 Pholcus xianrendong Liu & Tong, 2015 — China
 Pholcus xiaotu Yao & Li, 2012 — China
 Pholcus xinglong (Yao, Li & Lu, 2022) — China
 Pholcus xingqi Yao & Li, 2021 — China
 Pholcus xingren Chen, Zhang & Zhu, 2011 — China
 Pholcus xingyi Chen, Zhang & Zhu, 2011 — China
 Pholcus xinzhou (Yao, Li & Lu, 2022) — China
 Pholcus yangi Zhang & Zhu, 2009 — China
 Pholcus yanjinensis Yao & Li, 2016 — China
 Pholcus yanqing (Yao, Li & Lu, 2022) — China
 Pholcus yaoshan Yao & Li, 2021 — China
 Pholcus yeoncheonensis m, Lee & Lee, 2015 — Korea
 Pholcus yeongwol Huber, 2011 — Korea
 Pholcus yi Yao & Li, 2012 — China
 Pholcus yichengicus Zhu, Tu & Shi, 1986 — China
 Pholcus yongshun Yao & Li, 2018 — China
 Pholcus yoshikurai Irie, 1997 — Japan
 Pholcus yuantu Yao & Li, 2012 — China
 Pholcus yugong Zhang & Zhu, 2009 — China
 Pholcus yuhuangshan Yao & Li, 2021 — China
 Pholcus yunnanensis Yao & Li, 2012 — China
 Pholcus yuxi Yao & Li, 2018 — China
 Pholcus zham Zhang, Zhu & Song, 2006 — China, Nepal
 Pholcus zhangae Zhang & Zhu, 2009 — China
 Pholcus zhaoi Yao, Pham & Li, 2015 — Vietnam
 Pholcus zhongdongensis Yao & Li, 2016 — China
 Pholcus zhui Yao & Li, 2012 — China
 Pholcus zhuolu Zhang & Zhu, 2009 — China
 Pholcus zichyi Kulczynski, 1901 — Russia, China, Korea

Physocyclus

Physocyclus Simon, 1893
 Physocyclus bicornis Gertsch, 1971 — Mexico
 Physocyclus brevicornus Valdez-Mondragón, 2010 — Mexico
 Physocyclus californicus Chamberlin & Gertsch, 1929 — USA, Mexico
 Physocyclus cornutus Banks, 1898 — Mexico
 Physocyclus darwini Valdez-Mondragón, 2010 — Mexico
 Physocyclus dugesi Simon, 1893 — Mexico to Venezuela
 Physocyclus enaulus Crosby, 1926 — USA, Mexico
 Physocyclus franckei Valdez-Mondragón, 2010 — Mexico
 Physocyclus gertschi Valdez-Mondragón, 2010 — Mexico
 Physocyclus globosus (Taczanowski, 1874) (type) — North America. Introduced to Africa, Czechia, Iran, Sri Lanka, China, Japan, Philippines, Indonesia, Australia, Pacific islands
Physocyclus bicornis Gertsch, 1971 – Mexico
Physocyclus brevicornus Valdez-Mondragón, 2010 – Mexico
Physocyclus californicus Chamberlin & Gertsch, 1929 – US, Mexico
Physocyclus cornutus Banks, 1898 – Mexico
Physocyclus darwini Valdez-Mondragón, 2010 – Mexico
Physocyclus dugesi Simon, 1893 – Mexico to Venezuela
Physocyclus enaulus Crosby, 1926 – US, Mexico
Physocyclus franckei Valdez-Mondragón, 2010 – Mexico
Physocyclus gertschi Valdez-Mondragón, 2010 – Mexico
Physocyclus globosus (Taczanowski, 1874) (type) – North America. Introduced to Africa, Czechia, Iran, Sri Lanka, China, Japan, Philippines, Indonesia, Australia, Pacific islands
Physocyclus guanacaste Huber, 1998 – Costa Rica, Honduras
Physocyclus hoogstraali Gertsch & Davis, 1942 – US, Mexico
Physocyclus huacana Valdez-Mondragón, 2010 – Mexico
Physocyclus lautus Gertsch, 1971 – Mexico
Physocyclus lyncis (Nolasco & Valdez-Mondragón, 2022) – Mexico
Physocyclus mariachi (Nolasco & Valdez-Mondragón, 2022) – Mexico
Physocyclus marialuisae Valdez-Mondragón, 2010 – Mexico
Physocyclus merus Gertsch, 1971 – Mexico
Physocyclus mexicanus Banks, 1898 – Mexico
Physocyclus michoacanus Valdez-Mondragón, 2010 – Mexico
Physocyclus modestus Gertsch, 1971 – Mexico
Physocyclus montanoi Valdez-Mondragón, 2010 – Mexico
Physocyclus mysticus Chamberlin, 1924 – Mexico
Physocyclus palmarus Jiménez & Palacios-Cardiel, 2013 – Mexico
Physocyclus paredesi Valdez-Mondragón, 2010 – Mexico
Physocyclus pedregosus Gertsch, 1971 – Mexico
Physocyclus peribanensis Valdez-Mondragón, 2014 – Mexico
Physocyclus platnicki Valdez-Mondragón, 2010 – Mexico
Physocyclus pocamadre (Nolasco & Valdez-Mondragón, 2022) – Mexico
Physocyclus reddelli Gertsch, 1971 – Mexico
Physocyclus rothi Valdez-Mondragón, 2010 – Mexico
Physocyclus sarae Valdez-Mondragón, 2010 – Mexico
Physocyclus sikuapu (Nolasco & Valdez-Mondragón, 2022) – Mexico
Physocyclus sprousei Valdez-Mondragón, 2010 – Mexico
Physocyclus tanneri Chamberlin, 1921 – USA, Mexico
Physocyclus validus Gertsch, 1971 – Mexico
Physocyclus viridis Mello-Leitão, 1940 – Brazil
Physocyclus xerophilus (Nolasco & Valdez-Mondragón, 2020) – Mexico

Pinocchio

Pinocchio Huber & Carvalho, 2019
 Pinocchio barauna Huber & Carvalho, 2019 (type) — Brazil

Pisaboa

Pisaboa Huber, 2000
 Pisaboa estrecha Huber, 2000 — Peru
 Pisaboa laldea Huber, 2000 — Venezuela
 Pisaboa mapiri Huber, 2000 — Bolivia
 Pisaboa silvae Huber, 2000 (type) — Peru

Pomboa

Pomboa Huber, 2000
 Pomboa cali Huber, 2000 — Colombia
 Pomboa pallida Huber, 2000 — Colombia
 Pomboa quimbaya Valdez-Mondragón, 2012 — Colombia
 Pomboa quindio Huber, 2000 (type) — Colombia

Pribumia

Pribumia Huber, 2018
 Pribumia atrigularis (Simon, 1901) — Malaysia, Singapore, Indonesia
 Pribumia bohorok (Huber, 2011) — Indonesia (Sumatra)
 Pribumia diopsis (Simon, 1901) — Thailand
 Pribumia hurau (Huber, 2011) — Indonesia (Sumatra)
 Pribumia minang (Huber, 2011) — Indonesia (Sumatra)
 Pribumia singalang (Huber, 2011) (type) — Indonesia (Sumatra)

Priscula

Priscula Simon, 1893
Priscula acarite (Huber, 2020) – Venezuela
Priscula andinensis González-Sponga, 1999 – Venezuela
Priscula annulipes (Keyserling, 1877) – Colombia
Priscula binghamae (Chamberlin, 1916) – Peru, Bolivia, Argentina
Priscula bolivari (Huber, 2020) – Venezuela
Priscula chejapi González-Sponga, 1999 – Venezuela
Priscula gularis Simon, 1893 (type) – Ecuador
Priscula huila Huber, 2000 – Colombia
Priscula lagunosa González-Sponga, 1999 – Venezuela
Priscula limonensis González-Sponga, 1999 – Venezuela
Priscula paeza Huber, 2000 – Colombia
Priscula paila (Huber, 2020) – Venezuela
Priscula pallisteri Huber, 2000 – Peru
Priscula piapoco Huber, 2000 – Venezuela
Priscula piedraensis González-Sponga, 1999 – Venezuela
Priscula salmeronica González-Sponga, 1999 – Venezuela
Priscula taruma Huber, 2000 – Guyana
Priscula tunebo Huber, 2000 – Venezuela
Priscula ulai González-Sponga, 1999 – Venezuela
Priscula venezuelana Simon, 1893 – Venezuela

Psilochorus

Psilochorus Simon, 1893
 Psilochorus acanthus Chamberlin & Ivie, 1942 — USA
 Psilochorus agnosticus Chamberlin, 1924 — Mexico
 Psilochorus apicalis Banks, 1921 — USA
 Psilochorus bantus Chamberlin & Ivie, 1942 — USA
 Psilochorus bromelicola (Huber, 2019) — Brazil
 Psilochorus bruneocyaneus Mello-Leitão, 1941 — Brazil
 Psilochorus californiae Chamberlin, 1919 — USA
 Psilochorus cambridgei Gertsch & Davis, 1937 — Mexico
 Psilochorus coahuilanus Gertsch & Davis, 1937 — Mexico
 Psilochorus concinnus Gertsch, 1973 — Mexico
 Psilochorus conjunctus Gertsch & Davis, 1942 — Mexico
 Psilochorus cordatus (Bilimek, 1867) — Mexico
 Psilochorus cornutus (Keyserling, 1887) — USA
 Psilochorus delicatus Gertsch, 1971 — Mexico
 Psilochorus diablo Gertsch, 1971 — Mexico
 Psilochorus dogmaticus Chamberlin, 1924 — Mexico
 Psilochorus durangoanus Gertsch & Davis, 1937 — Mexico
 Psilochorus fishi Gertsch, 1971 — Mexico
 Psilochorus hesperus Gertsch & Ivie, 1936 — USA
 Psilochorus hooki Slowik, 2009 — USA
 Psilochorus imitatus Gertsch & Mulaik, 1940 — USA, Mexico
 Psilochorus inyo Slowik, 2009 — USA
 Psilochorus itaguyrussu Huber, Rheims & Brescovit, 2005 — Brazil
 Psilochorus minimus Schmidt, 1956 — Ecuador
 Psilochorus minutus Banks, 1898 — Mexico
 Psilochorus murphyi Gertsch, 1973 — Mexico
 Psilochorus pallidulus Gertsch, 1935 — USA, Mexico
 Psilochorus papago Gertsch & Davis, 1942 — USA, Mexico
 Psilochorus pullulus (Hentz, 1850) — New World
 Psilochorus redemptus Gertsch & Mulaik, 1940 — USA, Mexico
 Psilochorus rockefelleri Gertsch, 1935 — USA
 Psilochorus russelli Gertsch, 1971 — Mexico
 Psilochorus sectus Mello-Leitão, 1939 — Brazil
 Psilochorus simoni (Berland, 1911) — Europe
 Psilochorus sinaloa Gertsch & Davis, 1942 — Mexico
 Psilochorus taperae Mello-Leitão, 1929 — Brazil
 Psilochorus tellezi Gertsch, 1971 — Mexico
 Psilochorus texanus Slowik, 2009 — USA, Mexico
 Psilochorus topanga Chamberlin & Ivie, 1942 — USA
 Psilochorus utahensis Chamberlin, 1919 — USA
 Psilochorus ybytyriguara Huber, Rheims & Brescovit, 2005 — Brazil

Q

Quamtana

Quamtana Huber, 2003
 Quamtana biena Huber, 2003 — Congo
 Quamtana bonamanzi Huber, 2003 — South Africa
 Quamtana ciliata (Lawrence, 1938) — South Africa
 Quamtana embuleni Huber, 2003 — South Africa
 Quamtana entabeni Huber, 2003 — South Africa
 Quamtana filmeri Huber, 2003 — South Africa, Lesotho
 Quamtana hectori Huber, 2003 — South Africa
 Quamtana kabale Huber, 2003 — Uganda
 Quamtana kitahurira Huber, 2003 — Guinea, Angola, Uganda, Burundi, Congo
 Quamtana knysna Huber, 2003 — South Africa
 Quamtana lajuma Huber, 2003 — South Africa
 Quamtana leleupi Huber, 2003 — South Africa
 Quamtana leptopholcica (Strand, 1909) — South Africa
 Quamtana lotzi Huber, 2003 — South Africa
 Quamtana mabusai Huber, 2003 — South Africa, Eswatini
 Quamtana mbaba Huber, 2003 — South Africa
 Quamtana merwei Huber, 2003 (type) — South Africa
 Quamtana meyeri Huber, 2003 — South Africa
 Quamtana molimo Huber, 2003 — Lesotho
 Quamtana nandi Huber, 2003 — South Africa
 Quamtana nyahururu Huber & Warui, 2012 — Kenya, Tanzania
 Quamtana nylsvley Huber, 2003 — South Africa
 Quamtana oku Huber, 2003 — Cameroon
 Quamtana tsui Huber, 2003 — South Africa
 Quamtana umzinto Huber, 2003 — South Africa
 Quamtana vidal Huber, 2003 — South Africa

Queliceria

Queliceria González-Sponga, 2003
 Queliceria discrepantis González-Sponga, 2003 (type) — Venezuela

S

Saciperere

Saciperere Huber & Carvalho, 2019
 Saciperere catuaba Huber & Carvalho, 2019 (type) — Brazil

Savarna

Savarna Huber, 2005
 Savarna kaeo Huber, Petcharad & Bumrungsri, 2015 — Thailand
 Savarna kraburiensis Wongprom & Wiwatwitaya, 2015 — Thailand
 Savarna miser (Bristowe, 1952) — Malaysia, Indonesia (Sumatra)
 Savarna tesselata (Simon, 1901) — Thailand
 Savarna thaleban Huber, 2005 (type) — Thailand

Smeringopina

Smeringopina Kraus, 1957
 Smeringopina africana (Thorell, 1899) — West Africa
 Smeringopina ankasa Huber, 2013 — Ghana, Ivory Coast, Liberia
 Smeringopina armata (Thorell, 1899) — Cameroon
 Smeringopina attuleh Huber, 2013 — Cameroon
 Smeringopina bamenda Huber, 2013 — Cameroon
 Smeringopina bayaka Huber, 2013 — Gabon
 Smeringopina belinga Huber, 2013 — Gabon
 Smeringopina beninensis Kraus, 1957 (type) — Benin, Nigeria
 Smeringopina bineti (Millot, 1941) — Guinea
 Smeringopina bioko Huber, 2013 — Equatorial Guinea (Bioko)
 Smeringopina bomfobiri Huber, 2013 — Ghana
 Smeringopina bwiti Huber, 2013 — Gabon
 Smeringopina camerunensis Kraus, 1957 — Cameroon
 Smeringopina chaillu Huber, 2013 — Gabon
 Smeringopina cornigera (Simon, 1907) — Cameroon
 Smeringopina djidji Huber, 2013 — Gabon
 Smeringopina ebolowa Huber, 2013 — Cameroon
 Smeringopina essotah Huber, 2013 — Cameroon
 Smeringopina etome Huber, 2013 — Cameroon
 Smeringopina fang Huber, 2013 — Gabon
 Smeringopina fon Huber, 2013 — Benin, São Tomé and Príncipe, Nigeria
 Smeringopina guineensis (Millot, 1941) — Guinea, Liberia
 Smeringopina ibadan Huber, 2013 — Nigeria
 Smeringopina iboga Huber, 2013 — Gabon
 Smeringopina kala Huber, 2013 — Cameroon, Equatorial Guinea
 Smeringopina kikongo Huber, 2013 — Congo
 Smeringopina kinguele Huber, 2013 — Gabon
 Smeringopina kribi Huber, 2013 — Cameroon
 Smeringopina lekoni Huber, 2013 — Gabon
 Smeringopina luki Huber, 2013 — Congo
 Smeringopina mayebout Huber, 2013 — Gabon
 Smeringopina mbouda Huber, 2013 — Cameroon
 Smeringopina mohoba Huber, 2013 — Gabon
 Smeringopina moudouma Huber, 2013 — Gabon
 Smeringopina ndjole Huber, 2013 — Gabon
 Smeringopina ngungu Huber, 2013 — Congo
 Smeringopina nyasoso Huber, 2013 — Cameroon
 Smeringopina ogooue Huber, 2013 — Gabon
 Smeringopina pulchra (Millot, 1941) — West Africa
 Smeringopina sahoue Huber, 2013 — Gabon
 Smeringopina simintang Huber, 2013 — Gabon
 Smeringopina simplex Kraus, 1957 — Cameroon
 Smeringopina tchimbele Huber, 2013 — Gabon
 Smeringopina tebe Huber, 2013 — Gabon

Smeringopus

Smeringopus Simon, 1890
 Smeringopus affinitatus Strand, 1906 — Ethiopia
 Smeringopus arambourgi Fage, 1936 — Ethiopia, Somalia
 Smeringopus atomarius Simon, 1910 — Namibia, Botswana, South Africa
 Smeringopus badplaas Huber, 2012 — South Africa
 Smeringopus blyde Huber, 2012 — South Africa
 Smeringopus bujongolo Huber, 2012 — Congo, Uganda
 Smeringopus butare Huber, 2012 — Congo, Rwanda, Burundi
 Smeringopus bwindi Huber, 2012 — Congo, Uganda
 Smeringopus carli Lessert, 1915 — Uganda, Tanzania, Comoros, Madagascar
 Smeringopus chibububo Huber, 2012 — Mozambique
 Smeringopus chogoria Huber, 2012 — Kenya
 Smeringopus cylindrogaster (Simon, 1907) — West, Central Africa
 Smeringopus dehoop Huber, 2012 — South Africa
 Smeringopus dundo Huber, 2012 — Congo, Angola
 Smeringopus florisbad Huber, 2012 — South Africa
 Smeringopus hanglip Huber, 2012 — South Africa
 Smeringopus harare Huber, 2012 — Zimbabwe
 Smeringopus hypocrita Simon, 1910 — Namibia, South Africa
 Smeringopus isangi Huber, 2012 — Congo
 Smeringopus kalomo Huber, 2012 — Zambia, Zimbabwe, Mozambique, Madagascar
 Smeringopus katanga Huber, 2012 — Congo
 Smeringopus koppies Huber, 2012 — Botswana, South Africa
 Smeringopus lesnei Lessert, 1936 — Mozambique, Zimbabwe
 Smeringopus lesserti Kraus, 1957 — West, Central Africa
 Smeringopus lineiventris Simon, 1890 — Yemen
 Smeringopus lotzi Huber, 2012 — South Africa
 Smeringopus lubondai Huber, 2012 — Congo
 Smeringopus luki Huber, 2012 — Congo
 Smeringopus lydenberg Huber, 2012 — South Africa
 Smeringopus mayombe Huber, 2012 — Congo
 Smeringopus mgahinga Huber, 2012 — Congo, Uganda
 Smeringopus mlilwane Huber, 2012 — Eswatini, South Africa
 Smeringopus moxico Huber, 2012 — Angola
 Smeringopus mpanga Huber, 2012 — Uganda
 Smeringopus natalensis Lawrence, 1947 — Mozambique, South Africa. Introduced to Australia
 Smeringopus ndumo Huber, 2012 — South Africa
 Smeringopus ngangao Huber, 2012 — Kenya, Tanzania
 Smeringopus oromia Huber, 2012 — Ethiopia
 Smeringopus pallidus (Blackwall, 1858) (type) — Africa. Introduced to the Caribbean, South America, Sri Lanka, China, Laos, Philippines, Indonesia, Australia, Pacific islands
 Smeringopus peregrinoides Kraus, 1957 — Central, East Africa
 Smeringopus peregrinus Strand, 1906 — Kenya, Uganda, Tanzania, Madagascar
 Smeringopus principe Huber, 2012 — São Tomé and Príncipe
 Smeringopus roeweri Kraus, 1957 — Congo, Rwanda, Tanzania, Malawi
 Smeringopus rubrotinctus Strand, 1913 — Rwanda, Burundi
 Smeringopus ruhiza Huber, 2012 — Uganda, Burundi
 Smeringopus sambesicus Kraus, 1957 — Mozambique
 Smeringopus saruanle Huber, 2012 — Somalia
 Smeringopus sederberg Huber, 2012 — South Africa
 Smeringopus similis Kraus, 1957 — Namibia
 Smeringopus thomensis Simon, 1907 — São Tomé and Príncipe
 Smeringopus tombua Huber, 2012 — Angola
 Smeringopus turkana Huber, 2012 — Ethiopia, Kenya
 Smeringopus ubicki Huber, 2012 — South Africa
 Smeringopus uisib Huber, 2012 — Namibia
 Smeringopus zonatus Strand, 1906 — Ethiopia

Spermophora

Spermophora Hentz, 1841
Spermophora abibae Huber, 2014 – Congo
Spermophora akwamu Huber & Kwapong, 2013 – Ghana, Gabon
Spermophora awalai Huber, 2014 – Cameroon
Spermophora berlandi Fage, 1936 – Kenya
Spermophora bukusu Huber & Warui, 2012 – Kenya, Uganda
Spermophora deelemanae Huber, 2005 – Indonesia (Ambon)
Spermophora dieke Huber, 2009 – Guinea
Spermophora dumoga Huber, 2005 – Indonesia (Sulawesi)
Spermophora estebani Simon, 1892 – Philippines
Spermophora falcata Yao & Li, 2013 – Laos
Spermophora gordimerae Huber, 2003 – South Africa
Spermophora jocquei Huber, 2003 – Comoros, Mayotte
Spermophora kaindi Huber, 2005 – New Guinea
Spermophora kerinci Huber, 2005 – Indonesia (Sumatra, Bali). Introduced to Germany
Spermophora kirinyaga Huber & Warui, 2012 – Kenya
Spermophora kivu Huber, 2003 – Congo
Spermophora kyambura Huber & Warui, 2012 – Cameroon to Uganda
Spermophora lambilloni Huber, 2003 – Comoros
Spermophora luzonica Huber, 2005 – Philippines
Spermophora maathaiae Huber & Warui, 2012 – Kenya
Spermophora maculata Keyserling, 1891 – Brazil
Spermophora maros Huber, 2005 – Indonesia (Sulawesi)
Spermophora masisiwe Huber, 2003 – Tanzania
Spermophora mau Huber & Warui, 2012 – Kenya
Spermophora minotaura Berland, 1920 – East Africa
Spermophora morogoro Huber, 2003 – Tanzania
Spermophora palau Huber, 2005 – Caroline Is.
Spermophora paluma Huber, 2001 – Australia (Queensland)
Spermophora pembai Huber, 2003 – South Africa
Spermophora peninsulae Lawrence, 1964 – South Africa
Spermophora persica Senglet, 2008 – Iran
Spermophora ranomafana Huber, 2003 – Madagascar
Spermophora sangarawe Huber, 2003 – Tanzania
Spermophora schoemanae Huber, 2003 – South Africa
Spermophora senoculata (Dugès, 1836) (type) – Middle East. Introduced to USA, southern Europe, China, Korea, Japan
Spermophora senoculatoides Senglet, 2008 – Iran
Spermophora sumbawa Huber, 2005 – Indonesia (Sunda Is.)
Spermophora suurbraak Huber, 2003 – South Africa
Spermophora thorelli Roewer, 1942 – Myanmar
Spermophora tonkoui Huber, 2003 – Guinea, Ivory Coast
Spermophora tumbang Huber, 2005 – Borneo
Spermophora usambara Huber, 2003 – Tanzania
Spermophora vyvato Huber, 2003 – Madagascar
Spermophora yao Huber, 2001 – Australia (Queensland)
Spermophora ziama Huber & Kwapong, 2013 – Guinea

Spermophorides

Spermophorides Wunderlich, 1992
 Spermophorides africana Huber, 2007 — Tanzania
 Spermophorides anophthalma Wunderlich, 1999 — Canary Is.
 Spermophorides baunei Wunderlich, 1995 — Sardinia
 Spermophorides caesaris (Wunderlich, 1987) — Canary Is.
 Spermophorides cuneata (Wunderlich, 1987) — Canary Is.
 Spermophorides elevata (Simon, 1873) — Western Mediterranean
 Spermophorides esperanza (Wunderlich, 1987) — Canary Is.
 Spermophorides flava Wunderlich, 1992 — Canary Is.
 Spermophorides fuertecavensis Wunderlich, 1992 — Canary Is.
 Spermophorides fuerteventurensis (Wunderlich, 1987) — Canary Is.
 Spermophorides gibbifera (Wunderlich, 1987) — Canary Is.
 Spermophorides gomerensis (Wunderlich, 1987) — Canary Is.
 Spermophorides hermiguensis (Wunderlich, 1987) — Canary Is.
 Spermophorides heterogibbifera (Wunderlich, 1987) (type) — Canary Is.
 Spermophorides hierroensis Wunderlich, 1992 — Canary Is.
 Spermophorides huberti (Senglet, 1973) — Spain, France
 Spermophorides icodensis Wunderlich, 1992 — Canary Is.
 Spermophorides lanzarotensis Wunderlich, 1992 — Canary Is.
 Spermophorides lascars Saaristo, 2001 — Seychelles
 Spermophorides mamma (Wunderlich, 1987) — Canary Is.
 Spermophorides mammata (Senglet, 1973) — Spain
 Spermophorides mediterranea (Senglet, 1973) — Spain, France
 Spermophorides mercedes (Wunderlich, 1987) — Canary Is.
 Spermophorides petraea (Senglet, 1973) — Spain
 Spermophorides pseudomamma (Wunderlich, 1987) — Canary Is.
 Spermophorides ramblae Wunderlich, 1992 — Canary Is.
 Spermophorides reventoni Wunderlich, 1992 — Canary Is.
 Spermophorides sciakyi (Pesarini, 1984) — Canary Is.
 Spermophorides selvagensis Wunderlich, 1992 — Selvagens Is.
 Spermophorides simoni (Senglet, 1973) — France (Corsica)
 Spermophorides tenerifensis (Wunderlich, 1987) — Canary Is.
 Spermophorides tenoensis Wunderlich, 1992 — Canary Is.
 Spermophorides tilos (Wunderlich, 1987) — Canary Is.
 Spermophorides valentiana (Senglet, 1973) — Spain

Stenosfemuraia

Stenosfemuraia González-Sponga, 1998
 Stenosfemuraia cuadrata González-Sponga, 2005 — Venezuela
 Stenosfemuraia parva González-Sponga, 1998 (type) — Venezuela
 Stenosfemuraia pilosa (González-Sponga, 2005) — Venezuela

Stygopholcus

Stygopholcus Absolon & Kratochvíl, 1932
 Stygopholcus absoloni (Kulczyński, 1914) (type) — Croatia, Bosnia-Hercegovina
 Stygopholcus photophilus Senglet, 1971 — Greece
 Stygopholcus skotophilus Kratochvíl, 1940 — Bosnia-Hercegovina, Montenegro
 Stygopholcus skotophilus montenegrinus Kratochvíl, 1940 — Montenegro

Systenita

Systenita Simon, 1893
 Systenita prasina Simon, 1893 (type) — Venezuela

T

Tainonia

Tainonia Huber, 2000
 Tainonia bayahibe Huber & Astrin, 2009 — Hispaniola
 Tainonia cienaga Huber & Astrin, 2009 — Hispaniola
 Tainonia samana Huber & Astrin, 2009 — Hispaniola
 Tainonia serripes (Simon, 1893) (type) — Hispaniola
 Tainonia visite Huber & Astrin, 2009 — Hispaniola

Teranga

Teranga Huber, 2018
 Teranga cibodas (Huber, 2011) — Indonesia (Java)
 Teranga domingo (Huber, 2016) — Philippines
 Teranga kerinci (Huber, 2011) (type) — Indonesia (Sumatra)
 Teranga matutum (Huber, 2016) — Philippines

Tibetia

Tibetia Zhang, Zhu & Song, 2006
 Tibetia everesti (Hu & Li, 1987) (type) — Tibet

Tissahamia

Tissahamia Huber, 2018
 Tissahamia barisan (Huber, 2016) — Indonesia (Sumatra)
 Tissahamia bukittimah (Huber, 2016) — Singapore
 Tissahamia ethagala (Huber, 2011) (type) — Sri Lanka
 Tissahamia gombak (Huber, 2011) — Malaysia
 Tissahamia karuna Huber, 2019 — Sri Lanka
 Tissahamia kottawagamaensis (Yao & Li, 2016) — Sri Lanka
 Tissahamia ledang (Huber, 2011) — Malaysia
 Tissahamia maturata (Huber, 2011) — Sri Lanka
 Tissahamia phui (Huber, 2011) — Thailand
 Tissahamia tanahrata (Huber, 2016) — Malaysia
 Tissahamia uludong (Huber, 2016) — Malaysia
 Tissahamia vescula (Simon, 1901) — Malaysia

Tolteca

Tolteca Huber, 2000
 Tolteca hesperia (Gertsch, 1982) (type) — Mexico
 Tolteca jalisco (Gertsch, 1982) — Mexico

Tupigea

Tupigea Huber, 2000
 Tupigea ale Huber, 2011 — Brazil
 Tupigea altiventer (Keyserling, 1891) — Brazil
 Tupigea angelim Huber, 2011 — Brazil
 Tupigea cantareira Machado, Yamamoto, Brescovit & Huber, 2007 — Brazil
 Tupigea guapia Huber, 2011 — Brazil
 Tupigea lisei Huber, 2000 (type) — Brazil
 Tupigea maza Huber, 2000 — Brazil
 Tupigea nadleri Huber, 2000 — Brazil
 Tupigea paula Huber, 2000 — Brazil
 Tupigea penedo Huber, 2011 — Brazil
 Tupigea sicki Huber, 2000 — Brazil
 Tupigea teresopolis Huber, 2000 — Brazil

U

Uthina

Uthina Simon, 1893
 Uthina huahinensis Yao & Li, 2016 — Thailand
 Uthina huifengi Yao & Li, 2016 — Thailand, Malaysia, Indonesia (Sumatra)
 Uthina hylobatea Huber, Caspar & Eberle, 2019 — Indonesia (Bali, Java)
 Uthina javaensis Yao & Li, 2016 — Indonesia (Java)
 Uthina khaosokensis Yao, Li & Jäger, 2014 — Thailand
 Uthina luzonica Simon, 1893 (type) — Sri Lanka, Thailand, Malaysia, Indonesia, Philippines, northern Australia, Pacific Is. Introduced to Seychelles, Réunion, Taiwan
 Uthina maya Huber, Caspar & Eberle, 2019 — Indonesia (Bali)
 Uthina mimpi Huber, Caspar & Eberle, 2019 — Indonesia (Sulawesi)
 Uthina muangensis Yao & Li, 2016 — Thailand
 Uthina potharamensis Yao & Li, 2016 — Thailand
 Uthina ratchaburi Huber, 2011 — Thailand
 Uthina saiyokensis Yao & Li, 2016 — Thailand
 Uthina sarikaensis Yao & Li, 2016 — Thailand
 Uthina sulawesiensis Yao & Li, 2016 — Indonesia (Sulawesi, Ternate)
 Uthina wongpromi Yao & Li, 2016 — Thailand
 Uthina yunchuni Yao & Li, 2016 — Thailand
 Uthina zhigangi Yao & Li, 2016 — Thailand

W

Wanniyala

Wanniyala Huber & Benjamin, 2005
 Wanniyala agrabopath Huber & Benjamin, 2005 (type) — Sri Lanka
 Wanniyala hakgala Huber & Benjamin, 2005 — Sri Lanka
 Wanniyala labugama Huber, 2019 — Sri Lanka
 Wanniyala mapalena Huber, 2019 — Sri Lanka
 Wanniyala mudita Huber, 2019 — Sri Lanka
 Wanniyala ohiya Huber, 2019 — Sri Lanka
 Wanniyala orientalis Huber, 2019 — Sri Lanka
 Wanniyala upekkha Huber, 2019 — Sri Lanka
 Wanniyala viharekele Huber, 2019 — Sri Lanka

Waunana

Waunana Huber, 2000
 Waunana anchicaya Huber, 2000 — Colombia, Ecuador
 Waunana eberhardi Huber, 2000 — Colombia
 Waunana modesta (Banks, 1929) (type) — Panama
 Waunana tulcan Huber, 2000 — Ecuador

Wugigarra

Wugigarra Huber, 2001
 Wugigarra arcoona Huber, 2001 — Australia (South Australia)
 Wugigarra bujundji Huber, 2001 — Australia (Queensland)
 Wugigarra bulburin Huber, 2001 — Australia (Queensland)
 Wugigarra burgul Huber, 2001 — Australia (Queensland)
 Wugigarra eberhardi Huber, 2001 — Australia (New South Wales)
 Wugigarra gia Huber, 2001 — Australia (Queensland)
 Wugigarra idi Huber, 2001 — Australia (Queensland)
 Wugigarra jiman Huber, 2001 — Australia (Queensland)
 Wugigarra kalamai Huber, 2001 — Australia (Western Australia)
 Wugigarra kaurna Huber, 2001 — Australia (South Australia)
 Wugigarra mamu Huber, 2001 — Australia (Queensland)
 Wugigarra muluridji Huber, 2001 — Australia (Queensland)
 Wugigarra nauo Huber, 2001 — Australia (South Australia)
 Wugigarra sphaeroides (L. Koch, 1872) — Australia (Queensland)
 Wugigarra tjapukai Huber, 2001 (type) — Australia (Queensland)
 Wugigarra undanbi Huber, 2001 — Australia (Queensland)
 Wugigarra wanjuru Huber, 2001 — Australia (Queensland)
 Wugigarra wiri Huber, 2001 — Australia (Queensland)
 Wugigarra wulpura Huber, 2001 — Australia (Queensland)
 Wugigarra wunderlichi (Deeleman-Reinhold, 1995) — Australia (Queensland)
 Wugigarra yawai Huber, 2001 — Australia (Queensland, New South Wales)
 Wugigarra yirgay Huber, 2001 — Australia (Queensland)

Z

Zatavua

Zatavua Huber, 2003
 Zatavua analalava Huber, 2003 — Madagascar
 Zatavua andrei (Millot, 1946) — Madagascar
 Zatavua ankaranae (Millot, 1946) — Madagascar
 Zatavua fagei (Millot, 1946) — Madagascar
 Zatavua griswoldi Huber, 2003 (type) — Madagascar
 Zatavua imerinensis (Millot, 1946) — Madagascar
 Zatavua impudica (Millot, 1946) — Madagascar
 Zatavua isalo Huber, 2003 — Madagascar
 Zatavua kely Huber, 2003 — Madagascar
 Zatavua madagascariensis (Fage, 1945) — Madagascar
 Zatavua mahafaly Huber, 2003 — Madagascar
 Zatavua punctata (Millot, 1946) — Madagascar
 Zatavua talatakely Huber, 2003 — Madagascar
 Zatavua tamatave Huber, 2003 — Madagascar
 Zatavua voahangyae Huber, 2003 — Madagascar
 Zatavua vohiparara Huber, 2003 — Madagascar
 Zatavua zanahary Huber, 2003 — Madagascar

References

Pholcidae
Pholcidae